This is a partial list of unnumbered minor planets for principal provisional designations assigned between 16 March and 31 July 2000. , a total of 468 bodies remain unnumbered for this period. Objects for this year are listed on the following pages: A–E · F–O · P–R · S–T and U–Y. Also see previous and next year.

F 

|- id="2000 FJ4" bgcolor=#d6d6d6
| 0 ||  || MBA-O || 16.7 || 2.5 km || multiple || 2000–2018 || 09 Nov 2018 || 55 || align=left | Disc.: SpacewatchAlt.: 2011 HW52 || 
|- id="2000 FQ4" bgcolor=#E9E9E9
| 0 ||  || MBA-M || 18.2 || data-sort-value="0.96" | 960 m || multiple || 2000–2021 || 19 Mar 2021 || 52 || align=left | Disc.: SpacewatchAdded on 11 May 2021 || 
|- id="2000 FY5" bgcolor=#fefefe
| 0 ||  || MBA-I || 18.7 || data-sort-value="0.54" | 540 m || multiple || 2000–2017 || 21 Sep 2017 || 36 || align=left | Disc.: SpacewatchAlt.: 2013 EN77 || 
|- id="2000 FJ6" bgcolor=#fefefe
| 0 ||  || MBA-I || 18.7 || data-sort-value="0.54" | 540 m || multiple || 2000–2020 || 21 Apr 2020 || 74 || align=left | Disc.: SpacewatchAlt.: 2010 GY141 || 
|- id="2000 FB8" bgcolor=#C2E0FF
| 2 ||  || TNO || 8.2 || 108 km || multiple || 2000–2015 || 23 Mar 2015 || 18 || align=left | Disc.: Mauna Kea Obs.LoUTNOs, plutino || 
|- id="2000 FC8" bgcolor=#C2E0FF
| 4 ||  || TNO || 8.0 || 83 km || multiple || 2000–2015 || 24 Apr 2015 || 17 || align=left | Disc.: Mauna Kea Obs.LoUTNOs, cubewano (cold) || 
|- id="2000 FF8" bgcolor=#C2E0FF
| 2 ||  || TNO || 7.6 || 100 km || multiple || 2000–2017 || 28 May 2017 || 47 || align=left | Disc.: Mauna Kea Obs.LoUTNOs, cubewano (cold) || 
|- id="2000 FG8" bgcolor=#C2E0FF
| 2 ||  || TNO || 7.5 || 105 km || multiple || 2000–2017 || 29 Mar 2017 || 55 || align=left | Disc.: Mauna Kea Obs.LoUTNOs, cubewano (cold) || 
|- id="2000 FH8" bgcolor=#C2E0FF
| 3 ||  || TNO || 7.2 || 121 km || multiple || 2000–2018 || 16 May 2018 || 21 || align=left | Disc.: Mauna Kea Obs.LoUTNOs, cubewano (cold) || 
|- id="2000 FJ9" bgcolor=#E9E9E9
| 0 ||  || MBA-M || 17.86 || 1.1 km || multiple || 2000–2021 || 31 Mar 2021 || 96 || align=left | Disc.: Spacewatch || 
|- id="2000 FP10" bgcolor=#FFC2E0
| 1 ||  || AMO || 21.0 || data-sort-value="0.22" | 220 m || multiple || 2000–2019 || 23 Apr 2019 || 140 || align=left | Disc.: Spacewatch || 
|- id="2000 FX13" bgcolor=#FFC2E0
| 0 ||  || AMO || 20.08 || data-sort-value="0.34" | 340 m || multiple || 2000–2021 || 09 Dec 2021 || 65 || align=left | Disc.: LINEAR || 
|- id="2000 FC52" bgcolor=#fefefe
| 1 ||  || MBA-I || 18.8 || data-sort-value="0.52" | 520 m || multiple || 2000–2021 || 18 Jan 2021 || 60 || align=left | Disc.: SpacewatchAlt.: 2014 DR102 || 
|- id="2000 FE52" bgcolor=#d6d6d6
| 3 ||  || MBA-O || 17.2 || 2.0 km || multiple || 2000–2019 || 28 Nov 2019 || 23 || align=left | Disc.: SpacewatchAdded on 22 July 2020 || 
|- id="2000 FZ52" bgcolor=#d6d6d6
| 0 ||  || MBA-O || 16.88 || 2.3 km || multiple || 2000–2022 || 27 Jan 2022 || 88 || align=left | Disc.: Spacewatch || 
|- id="2000 FJ53" bgcolor=#fefefe
| 0 ||  || MBA-I || 17.9 || data-sort-value="0.78" | 780 m || multiple || 2000–2021 || 03 Jan 2021 || 117 || align=left | Disc.: Spacewatch || 
|- id="2000 FO53" bgcolor=#E9E9E9
| – ||  || MBA-M || 18.9 || data-sort-value="0.92" | 920 m || single || 12 days || 11 Apr 2000 || 9 || align=left | Disc.: Spacewatch || 
|- id="2000 FR53" bgcolor=#C2E0FF
| 3 ||  || TNO || 7.6 || 109 km || multiple || 2000–2015 || 13 Apr 2015 || 19 || align=left | Disc.: Mauna Kea Obs.LoUTNOs, res5:9 || 
|- id="2000 FS53" bgcolor=#C2E0FF
| 3 ||  || TNO || 7.8 || 92 km || multiple || 1999–2015 || 24 Apr 2015 || 30 || align=left | Disc.: La Silla Obs.LoUTNOs, cubewano (cold), BR-mag: 1.77Alt.: 1999 KS16 || 
|- id="2000 FT53" bgcolor=#C2E0FF
| 2 ||  || TNO || 8.3 || 112 km || multiple || 2000–2015 || 24 May 2015 || 17 || align=left | Disc.: Mauna Kea Obs.LoUTNOs, cubewano (hot) || 
|- id="2000 FU53" bgcolor=#C2E0FF
| E ||  || TNO || 8.5 || 68 km || single || 37 days || 07 May 2000 || 6 || align=left | Disc.: Mauna Kea Obs.LoUTNOs, cubewano? || 
|- id="2000 FV53" bgcolor=#C2E0FF
| 2 ||  || TNO || 8.3 || 103 km || multiple || 2000–2019 || 07 May 2019 || 28 || align=left | Disc.: Mauna Kea Obs.LoUTNOs, plutino || 
|- id="2000 FW53" bgcolor=#C2E0FF
| E ||  || TNO || 7.2 || 151 km || single || 6 days || 06 Apr 2000 || 5 || align=left | Disc.: Mauna Kea Obs.LoUTNOs, other TNO || 
|- id="2000 FY53" bgcolor=#C2E0FF
| 9 ||  || TNO || 8.8 || 70 km || single || 35 days || 05 May 2000 || 10 || align=left | Disc.: Mauna Kea Obs.LoUTNOs, plutino? || 
|- id="2000 FZ53" bgcolor=#C7FF8F
| 2 ||  || CEN || 11.4 || 29 km || multiple || 2000–2002 || 10 Apr 2002 || 19 || align=left | Disc.: Mauna Kea Obs., BR-mag: 1.17 || 
|- id="2000 FM54" bgcolor=#E9E9E9
| 0 ||  || MBA-M || 17.88 || 1.5 km || multiple || 2000–2022 || 26 Jan 2022 || 38 || align=left | Disc.: SpacewatchAdded on 19 October 2020 || 
|- id="2000 FO54" bgcolor=#E9E9E9
| 0 ||  || MBA-M || 18.22 || data-sort-value="0.95" | 950 m || multiple || 2000–2021 || 07 Apr 2021 || 57 || align=left | Disc.: SpacewatchAlt.: 2015 UR30 || 
|- id="2000 FQ54" bgcolor=#E9E9E9
| 0 ||  = (619202) || MBA-M || 17.7 || data-sort-value="0.86" | 860 m || multiple || 2000–2020 || 22 Mar 2020 || 82 || align=left | Disc.: Spacewatch || 
|- id="2000 FM64" bgcolor=#fefefe
| 0 ||  || MBA-I || 18.0 || data-sort-value="0.75" | 750 m || multiple || 2000–2018 || 06 Jun 2018 || 82 || align=left | Disc.: SpacewatchAlt.: 2014 DR8 || 
|- id="2000 FU64" bgcolor=#d6d6d6
| 0 ||  || MBA-O || 16.4 || 2.9 km || multiple || 2000–2021 || 11 Feb 2021 || 97 || align=left | Disc.: SpacewatchAdded on 30 September 2021Alt.: 2000 GM189, 2006 JF83 || 
|- id="2000 FB65" bgcolor=#fefefe
| 0 ||  || MBA-I || 18.38 || data-sort-value="0.63" | 630 m || multiple || 2000–2021 || 04 Oct 2021 || 56 || align=left | Disc.: Spacewatch || 
|- id="2000 FH65" bgcolor=#fefefe
| 0 ||  || MBA-I || 18.0 || data-sort-value="0.75" | 750 m || multiple || 2000–2020 || 13 Sep 2020 || 94 || align=left | Disc.: SpacewatchAlt.: 2015 CP45 || 
|- id="2000 FZ68" bgcolor=#E9E9E9
| 0 ||  || MBA-M || 17.4 || 1.4 km || multiple || 2000–2021 || 21 Jan 2021 || 92 || align=left | Disc.: SpacewatchAlt.: 2015 XD4 || 
|- id="2000 FD69" bgcolor=#fefefe
| 0 ||  || MBA-I || 18.0 || data-sort-value="0.75" | 750 m || multiple || 2000–2019 || 22 Oct 2019 || 65 || align=left | Disc.: SpacewatchAlt.: 2008 SW26 || 
|- id="2000 FF72" bgcolor=#fefefe
| 0 ||  || MBA-I || 17.85 || data-sort-value="0.80" | 800 m || multiple || 2000–2021 || 02 Apr 2021 || 96 || align=left | Disc.: Spacewatch || 
|- id="2000 FW72" bgcolor=#E9E9E9
| 0 ||  || MBA-M || 17.30 || 1.5 km || multiple || 2000–2021 || 03 May 2021 || 178 || align=left | Disc.: Spacewatch || 
|- id="2000 FH74" bgcolor=#fefefe
| 0 ||  || MBA-I || 18.1 || data-sort-value="0.71" | 710 m || multiple || 2000–2019 || 26 Sep 2019 || 73 || align=left | Disc.: Spacewatch || 
|- id="2000 FM74" bgcolor=#d6d6d6
| 0 ||  || MBA-O || 16.95 || 2.3 km || multiple || 2000–2022 || 14 Jan 2022 || 84 || align=left | Disc.: SpacewatchAlt.: 2010 AF96 || 
|- id="2000 FN74" bgcolor=#fefefe
| 0 ||  || MBA-I || 18.23 || data-sort-value="0.67" | 670 m || multiple || 1991–2021 || 08 May 2021 || 117 || align=left | Disc.: SpacewatchAlt.: 1998 TM35 || 
|- id="2000 FO74" bgcolor=#d6d6d6
| 0 ||  || MBA-O || 16.32 || 3.0 km || multiple || 2000–2021 || 03 Dec 2021 || 154 || align=left | Disc.: SpacewatchAlt.: 2010 CQ16, 2010 PY12 || 
|- id="2000 FP74" bgcolor=#fefefe
| 0 ||  || HUN || 18.3 || data-sort-value="0.65" | 650 m || multiple || 2000–2020 || 08 Dec 2020 || 141 || align=left | Disc.: Spacewatch || 
|- id="2000 FQ74" bgcolor=#E9E9E9
| 0 ||  || MBA-M || 17.89 || 1.1 km || multiple || 2000–2021 || 03 May 2021 || 80 || align=left | Disc.: Spacewatch || 
|- id="2000 FR74" bgcolor=#fefefe
| 0 ||  || MBA-I || 18.1 || data-sort-value="0.71" | 710 m || multiple || 2000–2021 || 18 Jan 2021 || 56 || align=left | Disc.: Spacewatch || 
|- id="2000 FS74" bgcolor=#fefefe
| 0 ||  || MBA-I || 18.7 || data-sort-value="0.54" | 540 m || multiple || 2000–2019 || 28 May 2019 || 95 || align=left | Disc.: Spacewatch || 
|}
back to top

G 

|- id="2000 GZ" bgcolor=#E9E9E9
| 0 || 2000 GZ || MBA-M || 16.93 || 1.2 km || multiple || 1996–2021 || 11 Aug 2021 || 104 || align=left | Disc.: SpacewatchAlt.: 2014 WQ294 || 
|- id="2000 GA2" bgcolor=#FA8072
| 6 ||  || MCA || 19.1 || data-sort-value="0.45" | 450 m || single || 33 days || 01 May 2000 || 84 || align=left | Disc.: LONEOS || 
|- id="2000 GB2" bgcolor=#FFC2E0
| 2 ||  || APO || 18.77 || data-sort-value="0.62" | 600 m || multiple || 2000–2022 || 17 Sep 2022 || 54 || align=left | Disc.: Spacewatch || 
|- id="2000 GF21" bgcolor=#fefefe
| 0 ||  || MBA-I || 17.42 || data-sort-value="0.98" | 980 m || multiple || 2000–2021 || 25 Nov 2021 || 109 || align=left | Disc.: LINEAR || 
|- id="2000 GL22" bgcolor=#E9E9E9
| 0 ||  || MBA-M || 16.9 || 1.8 km || multiple || 2000–2020 || 19 Jan 2020 || 140 || align=left | Disc.: LINEARAlt.: 2004 EC97, 2010 LZ157 || 
|- id="2000 GR22" bgcolor=#d6d6d6
| 0 ||  || MBA-O || 16.4 || 3.5 km || multiple || 2000–2021 || 17 Jan 2021 || 118 || align=left | Disc.: LINEARAlt.: 2010 FQ72 || 
|- id="2000 GO37" bgcolor=#fefefe
| 0 ||  || MBA-I || 18.50 || data-sort-value="0.59" | 590 m || multiple || 2000–2021 || 09 Jul 2021 || 117 || align=left | Disc.: LINEARAlt.: 2017 BY50 || 
|- id="2000 GV45" bgcolor=#E9E9E9
| 0 ||  || MBA-M || 17.1 || 1.6 km || multiple || 2000–2020 || 12 Dec 2020 || 75 || align=left | Disc.: LINEAR || 
|- id="2000 GV51" bgcolor=#E9E9E9
| 0 ||  || MBA-M || 16.9 || 1.8 km || multiple || 2000–2021 || 04 Jan 2021 || 134 || align=left | Disc.: LINEARAlt.: 2015 TM220 || 
|- id="2000 GD118" bgcolor=#E9E9E9
| 0 ||  || MBA-M || 17.2 || 1.1 km || multiple || 2000–2020 || 30 Jan 2020 || 49 || align=left | Disc.: SpacewatchAlt.: 2016 CS75 || 
|- id="2000 GV118" bgcolor=#E9E9E9
| 0 ||  || MBA-M || 17.87 || data-sort-value="0.79" | 790 m || multiple || 2000–2021 || 11 Jul 2021 || 113 || align=left | Disc.: SpacewatchAlt.: 2006 RL105 || 
|- id="2000 GK119" bgcolor=#d6d6d6
| 1 ||  || MBA-O || 17.16 || 2.1 km || multiple || 2000–2021 || 03 May 2021 || 39 || align=left | Disc.: SpacewatchAlt.: 2010 HM131 || 
|- id="2000 GE120" bgcolor=#fefefe
| 0 ||  || HUN || 19.1 || data-sort-value="0.45" | 450 m || multiple || 2000–2018 || 13 Apr 2018 || 47 || align=left | Disc.: Spacewatch || 
|- id="2000 GW120" bgcolor=#fefefe
| 1 ||  || MBA-I || 18.7 || data-sort-value="0.54" | 540 m || multiple || 2000–2020 || 10 Dec 2020 || 61 || align=left | Disc.: SpacewatchAlt.: 2011 JM24 || 
|- id="2000 GX120" bgcolor=#fefefe
| 0 ||  || MBA-I || 18.2 || data-sort-value="0.68" | 680 m || multiple || 1996–2020 || 23 Sep 2020 || 81 || align=left | Disc.: Spacewatch || 
|- id="2000 GT127" bgcolor=#FFC2E0
| 2 ||  || AMO || 22.2 || data-sort-value="0.13" | 130 m || multiple || 2000–2019 || 02 May 2019 || 33 || align=left | Disc.: Spacewatch || 
|- id="2000 GV127" bgcolor=#FFC2E0
| 0 ||  || AMO || 19.2 || data-sort-value="0.51" | 510 m || multiple || 2000–2019 || 26 Jun 2019 || 240 || align=left | Disc.: LINEAR || 
|- id="2000 GW127" bgcolor=#FFC2E0
| 1 ||  || APO || 19.4 || data-sort-value="0.477" | 477 m || multiple || 2000–2017 || 16 May 2017 || 104 || align=left | Disc.: LONEOSAlt.: 2016 QQ11 || 
|- id="2000 GZ127" bgcolor=#fefefe
| 0 ||  || MBA-I || 18.0 || data-sort-value="0.75" | 750 m || multiple || 1993–2018 || 05 Oct 2018 || 58 || align=left | Disc.: SpacewatchAlt.: 2011 SV201, 2017 DC11 || 
|- id="2000 GV128" bgcolor=#E9E9E9
| 0 ||  || MBA-M || 18.27 || data-sort-value="0.66" | 660 m || multiple || 2000–2021 || 30 Jul 2021 || 49 || align=left | Disc.: Spacewatch || 
|- id="2000 GN129" bgcolor=#fefefe
| 0 ||  || MBA-I || 17.8 || data-sort-value="0.82" | 820 m || multiple || 2000–2019 || 25 Sep 2019 || 105 || align=left | Disc.: Spacewatch || 
|- id="2000 GU129" bgcolor=#E9E9E9
| 0 ||  || MBA-M || 17.5 || 1.3 km || multiple || 2000–2021 || 11 Jun 2021 || 139 || align=left | Disc.: SpacewatchAlt.: 2015 XE363 || 
|- id="2000 GW129" bgcolor=#fefefe
| 1 ||  || MBA-I || 18.0 || data-sort-value="0.75" | 750 m || multiple || 2000–2019 || 10 Jul 2019 || 43 || align=left | Disc.: Spacewatch || 
|- id="2000 GO130" bgcolor=#d6d6d6
| 1 ||  || MBA-O || 16.4 || 2.9 km || multiple || 2000–2020 || 06 Dec 2020 || 52 || align=left | Disc.: SpacewatchAlt.: 2008 UN190 || 
|- id="2000 GR130" bgcolor=#d6d6d6
| 0 ||  || MBA-O || 16.90 || 2.3 km || multiple || 2000–2022 || 27 Jan 2022 || 76 || align=left | Disc.: Spacewatch || 
|- id="2000 GC131" bgcolor=#fefefe
| 0 ||  || MBA-I || 18.54 || data-sort-value="0.58" | 580 m || multiple || 2000–2021 || 27 Oct 2021 || 85 || align=left | Disc.: Spacewatch || 
|- id="2000 GN132" bgcolor=#fefefe
| 1 ||  || MBA-I || 18.7 || data-sort-value="0.54" | 540 m || multiple || 2000–2018 || 15 Apr 2018 || 37 || align=left | Disc.: Spacewatch || 
|- id="2000 GQ132" bgcolor=#FFE699
| 5 ||  || Asteroid || 17.7 || 1.6 km || single || 54 days || 05 Jun 2000 || 181 || align=left | Disc.: AMOSMCA at MPC || 
|- id="2000 GM137" bgcolor=#C7FF8F
| 1 ||  || CEN || 14.28 || 9.0 km || multiple || 2000–2022 || 25 Mar 2022 || 32 || align=left | Disc.: Mauna Kea Obs., albedo: 0.043 || 
|- id="2000 GY144" bgcolor=#fefefe
| 0 ||  || MBA-I || 18.8 || data-sort-value="0.52" | 520 m || multiple || 2000–2020 || 26 May 2020 || 53 || align=left | Disc.: Spacewatch || 
|- id="2000 GE146" bgcolor=#d6d6d6
| 0 ||  || MBA-O || 15.9 || 3.7 km || multiple || 1996–2021 || 04 Jan 2021 || 161 || align=left | Disc.: SpacewatchAlt.: 2006 MM5, 2011 GT86, 2018 SG4 || 
|- id="2000 GV146" bgcolor=#C2E0FF
| 5 ||  || TNO || 7.6 || 100 km || multiple || 2000–2022 || 26 Apr 2022 || 22 || align=left | Disc.: Mauna Kea Obs.LoUTNOs, cubewano (cold) || 
|- id="2000 GW146" bgcolor=#C2E0FF
| E ||  || TNO || 8.1 || 100 km || single || 1 day || 04 Apr 2000 || 6 || align=left | Disc.: Mauna Kea Obs.LoUTNOs, other TNO || 
|- id="2000 GX146" bgcolor=#C2E0FF
| 3 ||  || TNO || 7.8 || 92 km || multiple || 2000–2015 || 23 Mar 2015 || 21 || align=left | Disc.: Mauna Kea Obs.LoUTNOs, cubewano (cold) || 
|- id="2000 GY146" bgcolor=#C2E0FF
| 3 ||  || TNO || 7.9 || 87 km || multiple || 2000–2015 || 23 Mar 2015 || 17 || align=left | Disc.: Mauna Kea Obs.LoUTNOs, cubewano (cold) || 
|- id="2000 GZ146" bgcolor=#C2E0FF
| E ||  || TNO || 7.8 || 95 km || single || 2 days || 05 Apr 2000 || 6 || align=left | Disc.: Mauna Kea Obs.LoUTNOs, cubewano? || 
|- id="2000 GC147" bgcolor=#FFC2E0
| 1 ||  || AMO || 20.0 || data-sort-value="0.36" | 360 m || multiple || 2000–2014 || 04 Feb 2014 || 53 || align=left | Disc.: Mauna Kea Obs. || 
|- id="2000 GF147" bgcolor=#C2E0FF
| E ||  || TNO || 8.2 || 79 km || single || 1 day || 06 Apr 2000 || 4 || align=left | Disc.: Mauna Kea Obs.LoUTNOs, cubewano? || 
|- id="2000 GK147" bgcolor=#C2E0FF
| E ||  || TNO || 9.2 || 55 km || single || 35 days || 07 May 2000 || 8 || align=left | Disc.: Mauna Kea Obs.LoUTNOs, SDO || 
|- id="2000 GL147" bgcolor=#C2E0FF
| E ||  || TNO || 8.81 || 78 km || single || 5 days || 04 May 2000 || 5 || align=left | Disc.: Mauna Kea Obs.LoUTNOs, plutino? || 
|- id="2000 GM147" bgcolor=#C2E0FF
| E ||  || TNO || 7.9 || 124 km || single || 33 days || 06 May 2000 || 7 || align=left | Disc.: Mauna Kea Obs.LoUTNOs, plutino? || 
|- id="2000 GC150" bgcolor=#fefefe
| 0 ||  || MBA-I || 17.59 || data-sort-value="0.90" | 900 m || multiple || 2000–2021 || 08 May 2021 || 209 || align=left | Disc.: LINEARAlt.: 2009 VN115, 2012 RS, 2014 EN128, 2016 UR64 || 
|- id="2000 GN151" bgcolor=#fefefe
| 0 ||  || MBA-I || 18.32 || data-sort-value="0.64" | 640 m || multiple || 2000–2021 || 08 Sep 2021 || 74 || align=left | Disc.: LINEARAlt.: 2010 JL23 || 
|- id="2000 GS175" bgcolor=#E9E9E9
| 1 ||  || MBA-M || 17.4 || 1.4 km || multiple || 2000–2019 || 29 Sep 2019 || 45 || align=left | Disc.: Spacewatch || 
|- id="2000 GH182" bgcolor=#d6d6d6
| 0 ||  || MBA-O || 16.56 || 2.7 km || multiple || 2000–2021 || 14 Apr 2021 || 116 || align=left | Disc.: Spacewatch || 
|- id="2000 GZ182" bgcolor=#d6d6d6
| 0 ||  || MBA-O || 16.4 || 2.9 km || multiple || 2000–2021 || 16 Jan 2021 || 124 || align=left | Disc.: SpacewatchAlt.: 2011 GD16, 2013 SY92, 2016 CR63 || 
|- id="2000 GE183" bgcolor=#E9E9E9
| 1 ||  || MBA-M || 17.9 || data-sort-value="0.78" | 780 m || multiple || 2000–2020 || 01 Feb 2020 || 72 || align=left | Disc.: SpacewatchAlt.: 2016 CG199 || 
|- id="2000 GB184" bgcolor=#fefefe
| 1 ||  || MBA-I || 19.3 || data-sort-value="0.41" | 410 m || multiple || 2000–2019 || 08 May 2019 || 91 || align=left | Disc.: SpacewatchAlt.: 2011 CT43 || 
|- id="2000 GG184" bgcolor=#d6d6d6
| 0 ||  || MBA-O || 16.2 || 3.2 km || multiple || 2000–2019 || 17 Dec 2019 || 100 || align=left | Disc.: Spacewatch || 
|- id="2000 GX184" bgcolor=#fefefe
| 0 ||  || MBA-I || 18.4 || data-sort-value="0.62" | 620 m || multiple || 1996–2020 || 05 Nov 2020 || 40 || align=left | Disc.: Spacewatch || 
|- id="2000 GY187" bgcolor=#E9E9E9
| 1 ||  || MBA-M || 16.8 || 1.8 km || multiple || 2000–2017 || 16 Feb 2017 || 38 || align=left | Disc.: Spacewatch || 
|- id="2000 GB188" bgcolor=#d6d6d6
| 0 ||  || MBA-O || 16.3 || 3.1 km || multiple || 1991–2021 || 15 Jan 2021 || 98 || align=left | Disc.: SpacewatchAlt.: 2010 HR128, 2016 FP16 || 
|- id="2000 GG188" bgcolor=#fefefe
| 0 ||  || MBA-I || 17.7 || data-sort-value="0.86" | 860 m || multiple || 2000–2020 || 10 Sep 2020 || 76 || align=left | Disc.: Spacewatch || 
|- id="2000 GH188" bgcolor=#E9E9E9
| 0 ||  || MBA-M || 17.4 || 1.4 km || multiple || 2000–2021 || 12 Jun 2021 || 95 || align=left | Disc.: Spacewatch || 
|- id="2000 GK188" bgcolor=#d6d6d6
| 0 ||  || MBA-O || 16.3 || 3.1 km || multiple || 2000–2019 || 28 Nov 2019 || 95 || align=left | Disc.: SpacewatchAlt.: 2016 AB161 || 
|- id="2000 GL188" bgcolor=#E9E9E9
| 0 ||  || MBA-M || 17.3 || 1.5 km || multiple || 2000–2021 || 10 Jan 2021 || 80 || align=left | Disc.: Spacewatch || 
|- id="2000 GM188" bgcolor=#d6d6d6
| 0 ||  || MBA-O || 16.98 || 2.2 km || multiple || 2000–2022 || 04 Jan 2022 || 75 || align=left | Disc.: Spacewatch || 
|- id="2000 GN188" bgcolor=#d6d6d6
| 0 ||  || MBA-O || 16.9 || 2.3 km || multiple || 2000–2021 || 12 Jan 2021 || 65 || align=left | Disc.: Spacewatch || 
|- id="2000 GP188" bgcolor=#fefefe
| 0 ||  || MBA-I || 18.3 || data-sort-value="0.65" | 650 m || multiple || 2000–2020 || 07 Dec 2020 || 54 || align=left | Disc.: Spacewatch || 
|- id="2000 GR188" bgcolor=#fefefe
| 0 ||  || MBA-I || 19.35 || data-sort-value="0.40" | 400 m || multiple || 2000–2021 || 05 Jun 2021 || 71 || align=left | Disc.: Spacewatch || 
|- id="2000 GS188" bgcolor=#fefefe
| 1 ||  = (619203) || MBA-I || 18.9 || data-sort-value="0.49" | 490 m || multiple || 2000–2019 || 29 Sep 2019 || 41 || align=left | Disc.: Spacewatch || 
|- id="2000 GT188" bgcolor=#d6d6d6
| 0 ||  || MBA-O || 16.71 || 2.5 km || multiple || 2000–2021 || 28 Nov 2021 || 60 || align=left | Disc.: Spacewatch || 
|- id="2000 GU188" bgcolor=#fefefe
| 0 ||  || MBA-I || 18.32 || data-sort-value="0.64" | 640 m || multiple || 2000–2021 || 17 Apr 2021 || 60 || align=left | Disc.: Spacewatch || 
|- id="2000 GV188" bgcolor=#d6d6d6
| 0 ||  || MBA-O || 17.54 || 1.7 km || multiple || 2000–2022 || 27 Jan 2022 || 43 || align=left | Disc.: SpacewatchAlt.: 2003 UX448 || 
|- id="2000 GW188" bgcolor=#E9E9E9
| 0 ||  || MBA-M || 17.59 || 1.3 km || multiple || 2000–2021 || 18 Apr 2021 || 86 || align=left | Disc.: Spacewatch || 
|- id="2000 GX188" bgcolor=#E9E9E9
| 0 ||  || MBA-M || 17.14 || 1.6 km || multiple || 2000–2021 || 08 Apr 2021 || 140 || align=left | Disc.: Spacewatch || 
|- id="2000 GY188" bgcolor=#fefefe
| 0 ||  || MBA-I || 18.6 || data-sort-value="0.57" | 570 m || multiple || 2000–2019 || 05 Oct 2019 || 75 || align=left | Disc.: Spacewatch || 
|- id="2000 GA189" bgcolor=#d6d6d6
| 0 ||  || MBA-O || 16.61 || 2.7 km || multiple || 2000–2021 || 05 Jun 2021 || 127 || align=left | Disc.: Spacewatch || 
|- id="2000 GB189" bgcolor=#d6d6d6
| 0 ||  || MBA-O || 16.60 || 2.7 km || multiple || 2000–2021 || 13 Apr 2021 || 102 || align=left | Disc.: SpacewatchAlt.: 2010 GF70 || 
|- id="2000 GC189" bgcolor=#fefefe
| 0 ||  || MBA-I || 18.6 || data-sort-value="0.57" | 570 m || multiple || 2000–2018 || 19 May 2018 || 34 || align=left | Disc.: Spacewatch || 
|- id="2000 GD189" bgcolor=#fefefe
| 0 ||  || MBA-I || 18.1 || data-sort-value="0.71" | 710 m || multiple || 2000–2020 || 15 Oct 2020 || 46 || align=left | Disc.: Spacewatch || 
|- id="2000 GE189" bgcolor=#fefefe
| 0 ||  || MBA-I || 18.3 || data-sort-value="0.65" | 650 m || multiple || 2000–2019 || 02 Oct 2019 || 44 || align=left | Disc.: Spacewatch || 
|- id="2000 GF189" bgcolor=#fefefe
| 0 ||  || MBA-I || 18.3 || data-sort-value="0.65" | 650 m || multiple || 2000–2019 || 03 Oct 2019 || 61 || align=left | Disc.: Spacewatch || 
|- id="2000 GJ189" bgcolor=#fefefe
| 1 ||  || MBA-I || 18.4 || data-sort-value="0.62" | 620 m || multiple || 2000–2020 || 25 Oct 2020 || 40 || align=left | Disc.: SpacewatchAdded on 17 January 2021 || 
|- id="2000 GK189" bgcolor=#fefefe
| 1 ||  || MBA-I || 18.2 || data-sort-value="0.68" | 680 m || multiple || 2000–2021 || 15 Feb 2021 || 62 || align=left | Disc.: SpacewatchAdded on 9 March 2021 || 
|- id="2000 GO189" bgcolor=#d6d6d6
| 2 ||  || MBA-O || 17.41 || 1.8 km || multiple || 2000–2018 || 14 Sep 2018 || 23 || align=left | Disc.: SpacewatchAdded on 5 November 2021 || 
|}
back to top

H 

|- id="2000 HM" bgcolor=#d6d6d6
| 0 || 2000 HM || MBA-O || 16.2 || 3.2 km || multiple || 2000–2020 || 24 Dec 2020 || 129 || align=left | Disc.: SpacewatchAlt.: 2011 FZ74, 2017 HR12 || 
|- id="2000 HT1" bgcolor=#d6d6d6
| 0 ||  || MBA-O || 16.4 || 2.9 km || multiple || 2000–2020 || 10 Dec 2020 || 48 || align=left | Disc.: Spacewatch || 
|- id="2000 HE2" bgcolor=#d6d6d6
| 0 ||  || MBA-O || 16.88 || 2.3 km || multiple || 2000–2018 || 07 Sep 2018 || 53 || align=left | Disc.: SpacewatchAdded on 24 December 2021 || 
|- id="2000 HQ3" bgcolor=#FA8072
| 0 ||  || MCA || 18.82 || data-sort-value="0.51" | 510 m || multiple || 2000–2021 || 02 Jun 2021 || 223 || align=left | Disc.: LONEOSAlt.: 2007 HC2 || 
|- id="2000 HF6" bgcolor=#d6d6d6
| 0 ||  || MBA-O || 16.4 || 2.9 km || multiple || 2000–2021 || 19 Jan 2021 || 157 || align=left | Disc.: SpacewatchAlt.: 2010 FD42 || 
|- id="2000 HB17" bgcolor=#fefefe
| 0 ||  || MBA-I || 17.9 || data-sort-value="0.78" | 780 m || multiple || 2000–2020 || 17 Nov 2020 || 85 || align=left | Disc.: SpacewatchAdded on 22 July 2020 || 
|- id="2000 HR17" bgcolor=#fefefe
| 0 ||  || MBA-I || 17.8 || data-sort-value="0.82" | 820 m || multiple || 2000–2021 || 18 Jan 2021 || 108 || align=left | Disc.: SpacewatchAlt.: 2008 SJ169 || 
|- id="2000 HT17" bgcolor=#fefefe
| 0 ||  || MBA-I || 18.72 || data-sort-value="0.54" | 540 m || multiple || 2000–2022 || 25 Jan 2022 || 35 || align=left | Disc.: SpacewatchAlt.: 2015 HB29 || 
|- id="2000 HE18" bgcolor=#fefefe
| 0 ||  || MBA-I || 18.4 || data-sort-value="0.62" | 620 m || multiple || 2000–2020 || 10 Dec 2020 || 107 || align=left | Disc.: SpacewatchAdded on 22 July 2020Alt.: 2016 UJ160 || 
|- id="2000 HM19" bgcolor=#fefefe
| 1 ||  || MBA-I || 18.7 || data-sort-value="0.54" | 540 m || multiple || 2000–2017 || 28 Mar 2017 || 22 || align=left | Disc.: Spacewatch || 
|- id="2000 HB24" bgcolor=#FFC2E0
| 2 ||  || ATE || 23.7 || data-sort-value="0.065" | 65 m || multiple || 2000–2017 || 22 Jun 2017 || 112 || align=left | Disc.: LINEAR || 
|- id="2000 HJ31" bgcolor=#d6d6d6
| 0 ||  || MBA-O || 15.9 || 3.7 km || multiple || 2000–2021 || 16 Jan 2021 || 124 || align=left | Disc.: LINEAR || 
|- id="2000 HO40" bgcolor=#FFC2E0
| 3 ||  || ATE || 22.3 || data-sort-value="0.12" | 120 m || multiple || 2000–2020 || 25 May 2020 || 125 || align=left | Disc.: LONEOS || 
|- id="2000 HP40" bgcolor=#FFC2E0
| 1 ||  || AMO || 23.99 || data-sort-value="0.056" | 56 m || multiple || 2000-2022 || 22 Apr 2022 || 45 || align=left | Disc.: LINEAR || 
|- id="2000 HC46" bgcolor=#E9E9E9
| 0 ||  || MBA-M || 17.02 || 1.7 km || multiple || 2000–2021 || 11 May 2021 || 132 || align=left | Disc.: LINEARAlt.: 2014 UA91, 2017 HK13 || 
|- id="2000 HE46" bgcolor=#C7FF8F
| 2 ||  || CEN || 14.8 || 6.0 km || multiple || 2000–2000 || 05 Dec 2000 || 118 || align=left | Disc.: LONEOS, albedo: 0.045; BR-mag: 1.42 || 
|- id="2000 HD61" bgcolor=#E9E9E9
| 0 ||  || MBA-M || 16.7 || 1.9 km || multiple || 2000–2021 || 09 Jun 2021 || 165 || align=left | Disc.: LONEOSAlt.: 2014 SP153, 2014 UT272 || 
|- id="2000 HZ90" bgcolor=#d6d6d6
| 0 ||  || MBA-O || 16.7 || 2.5 km || multiple || 2000–2021 || 12 Jan 2021 || 47 || align=left | Disc.: Spacewatch || 
|- id="2000 HN91" bgcolor=#E9E9E9
| 0 ||  || MBA-M || 17.1 || 1.6 km || multiple || 2000–2020 || 21 Jan 2020 || 72 || align=left | Disc.: Spacewatch || 
|- id="2000 HO91" bgcolor=#fefefe
| 0 ||  || MBA-I || 18.6 || data-sort-value="0.57" | 570 m || multiple || 2000–2018 || 03 Oct 2018 || 37 || align=left | Disc.: SpacewatchAdded on 21 August 2021 || 
|- id="2000 HY95" bgcolor=#fefefe
| 0 ||  || MBA-I || 17.5 || data-sort-value="0.94" | 940 m || multiple || 2000–2020 || 23 Jan 2020 || 131 || align=left | Disc.: SpacewatchAlt.: 2017 DO119 || 
|- id="2000 HQ97" bgcolor=#fefefe
| 0 ||  || MBA-I || 18.0 || data-sort-value="0.75" | 750 m || multiple || 2000–2019 || 03 Dec 2019 || 68 || align=left | Disc.: SpacewatchAlt.: 2015 RL56 || 
|- id="2000 HJ99" bgcolor=#E9E9E9
| 0 ||  || MBA-M || 17.56 || 1.3 km || multiple || 2000–2021 || 08 Apr 2021 || 108 || align=left | Disc.: SpacewatchAlt.: 2008 CX106, 2014 SU124 || 
|- id="2000 HT100" bgcolor=#fefefe
| 0 ||  || MBA-I || 17.8 || data-sort-value="0.82" | 820 m || multiple || 2000–2020 || 08 Dec 2020 || 89 || align=left | Disc.: SpacewatchAdded on 22 July 2020Alt.: 2015 LS19 || 
|- id="2000 HZ100" bgcolor=#E9E9E9
| 0 ||  || MBA-M || 17.3 || 1.5 km || multiple || 2000–2019 || 28 Nov 2019 || 54 || align=left | Disc.: SpacewatchAdded on 22 July 2020Alt.: 2014 QU160 || 
|- id="2000 HH101" bgcolor=#E9E9E9
| 0 ||  || MBA-M || 17.10 || 1.1 km || multiple || 2000–2021 || 09 Jun 2021 || 82 || align=left | Disc.: Spacewatch || 
|- id="2000 HF102" bgcolor=#fefefe
| 0 ||  || MBA-I || 18.5 || data-sort-value="0.59" | 590 m || multiple || 2000–2019 || 26 Sep 2019 || 56 || align=left | Disc.: SpacewatchAdded on 17 January 2021Alt.: 2015 PX259 || 
|- id="2000 HU102" bgcolor=#d6d6d6
| 0 ||  || MBA-O || 16.5 || 2.8 km || multiple || 2000–2021 || 18 Jan 2021 || 95 || align=left | Disc.: Spacewatch || 
|- id="2000 HF105" bgcolor=#d6d6d6
| 0 ||  || MBA-O || 16.94 || 2.3 km || multiple || 2000–2021 || 13 May 2021 || 66 || align=left | Disc.: Spacewatch || 
|- id="2000 HV105" bgcolor=#d6d6d6
| 0 ||  || MBA-O || 16.5 || 2.8 km || multiple || 2000–2016 || 30 Apr 2016 || 46 || align=left | Disc.: La Silla Obs. || 
|- id="2000 HA106" bgcolor=#E9E9E9
| 0 ||  || MBA-M || 17.5 || 1.3 km || multiple || 2000–2021 || 17 Jan 2021 || 75 || align=left | Disc.: Spacewatch || 
|- id="2000 HC106" bgcolor=#fefefe
| 0 ||  || MBA-I || 18.2 || data-sort-value="0.68" | 680 m || multiple || 2000–2020 || 19 Nov 2020 || 52 || align=left | Disc.: Spacewatch || 
|- id="2000 HD106" bgcolor=#d6d6d6
| 0 ||  || MBA-O || 16.4 || 2.9 km || multiple || 2000–2020 || 25 Jan 2020 || 70 || align=left | Disc.: Spacewatch || 
|- id="2000 HE106" bgcolor=#d6d6d6
| 0 ||  || MBA-O || 16.64 || 2.6 km || multiple || 2000–2021 || 10 Apr 2021 || 70 || align=left | Disc.: Spacewatch || 
|- id="2000 HF106" bgcolor=#fefefe
| 0 ||  || MBA-I || 18.6 || data-sort-value="0.57" | 570 m || multiple || 2000–2018 || 05 Oct 2018 || 36 || align=left | Disc.: Spacewatch || 
|- id="2000 HG106" bgcolor=#fefefe
| 0 ||  || MBA-I || 18.5 || data-sort-value="0.59" | 590 m || multiple || 2000–2019 || 27 Oct 2019 || 47 || align=left | Disc.: Spacewatch || 
|- id="2000 HH106" bgcolor=#E9E9E9
| 0 ||  || MBA-M || 17.5 || 1.8 km || multiple || 2000–2019 || 26 Jul 2019 || 49 || align=left | Disc.: SpacewatchAlt.: 2010 HW130 || 
|- id="2000 HK106" bgcolor=#E9E9E9
| 0 ||  || MBA-M || 17.9 || 1.1 km || multiple || 2000–2021 || 17 Jan 2021 || 60 || align=left | Disc.: Spacewatch || 
|- id="2000 HL106" bgcolor=#E9E9E9
| 0 ||  || MBA-M || 17.82 || 1.5 km || multiple || 2000–2022 || 25 Jan 2022 || 36 || align=left | Disc.: Spacewatch || 
|- id="2000 HM106" bgcolor=#fefefe
| 2 ||  || MBA-I || 18.6 || data-sort-value="0.57" | 570 m || multiple || 2000–2019 || 06 Apr 2019 || 25 || align=left | Disc.: No observationsAdded on 24 December 2021 || 
|}
back to top

J 

|- id="2000 JD2" bgcolor=#fefefe
| 0 ||  || HUN || 18.4 || data-sort-value="0.62" | 620 m || multiple || 2000–2020 || 28 May 2020 || 40 || align=left | Disc.: Spacewatch || 
|- id="2000 JD3" bgcolor=#E9E9E9
| 0 ||  || MBA-M || 16.84 || 1.3 km || multiple || 2000–2021 || 11 Jun 2021 || 221 || align=left | Disc.: LINEAR || 
|- id="2000 JO4" bgcolor=#d6d6d6
| 0 ||  || MBA-O || 17.37 || 1.9 km || multiple || 2000–2021 || 26 Nov 2021 || 42 || align=left | Disc.: SpacewatchAdded on 22 July 2020Alt.: 2005 JJ135 || 
|- id="2000 JF5" bgcolor=#FFC2E0
| – ||  || APO || 21.9 || data-sort-value="0.15" | 150 m || single || 5 days || 06 May 2000 || 65 || align=left | Disc.: LINEARPotentially hazardous object || 
|- id="2000 JC8" bgcolor=#fefefe
| 0 ||  || MBA-I || 18.67 || data-sort-value="0.55" | 550 m || multiple || 2000–2021 || 06 Oct 2021 || 63 || align=left | Disc.: Spacewatch || 
|- id="2000 JX8" bgcolor=#FFC2E0
| 8 ||  || AMO || 25.4 || data-sort-value="0.030" | 30 m || single || 3 days || 05 May 2000 || 20 || align=left | Disc.: LINEAR || 
|- id="2000 JZ8" bgcolor=#FFC2E0
| 6 ||  || AMO || 20.8 || data-sort-value="0.25" | 250 m || single || 60 days || 02 Jul 2000 || 55 || align=left | Disc.: LINEAR || 
|- id="2000 JY64" bgcolor=#d6d6d6
| 0 ||  || MBA-O || 17.04 || 2.2 km || multiple || 2000–2022 || 25 Jan 2022 || 93 || align=left | Disc.: LONEOS || 
|- id="2000 JZ66" bgcolor=#fefefe
| 1 ||  || MBA-I || 18.6 || data-sort-value="0.57" | 570 m || multiple || 2000–2019 || 28 May 2019 || 129 || align=left | Disc.: SpacewatchAlt.: 2015 EM61 || 
|- id="2000 JF75" bgcolor=#d6d6d6
| 0 ||  || MBA-O || 16.39 || 2.9 km || multiple || 2000–2021 || 16 May 2021 || 138 || align=left | Disc.: Spacewatch || 
|- id="2000 JA80" bgcolor=#fefefe
| 0 ||  || MBA-I || 17.9 || data-sort-value="0.78" | 780 m || multiple || 2000–2021 || 18 Jan 2021 || 80 || align=left | Disc.: SpacewatchAlt.: 2007 EF71 || 
|- id="2000 JR80" bgcolor=#fefefe
| 0 ||  = (619204) || MBA-I || 17.4 || data-sort-value="0.98" | 980 m || multiple || 2000–2020 || 31 Jan 2020 || 188 || align=left | Disc.: SpacewatchAlt.: 2010 EN36, 2015 VS111 || 
|- id="2000 JF81" bgcolor=#C2E0FF
| 3 ||  || TNO || 7.2 || 121 km || multiple || 2000–2014 || 30 May 2014 || 24 || align=left | Disc.: La Silla Obs.LoUTNOs, cubewano (cold) || 
|- id="2000 JH81" bgcolor=#C2E0FF
| E ||  || TNO || 8.8 || 60 km || single || 2 days || 08 May 2000 || 5 || align=left | Disc.: La Silla Obs.LoUTNOs, cubewano? || 
|- id="2000 JN85" bgcolor=#fefefe
| 0 ||  || MBA-I || 18.6 || data-sort-value="0.57" | 570 m || multiple || 2000–2019 || 29 Sep 2019 || 63 || align=left | Disc.: Spacewatch || 
|- id="2000 JX89" bgcolor=#d6d6d6
| 0 ||  || MBA-O || 16.87 || 2.4 km || multiple || 2000–2021 || 11 Oct 2021 || 96 || align=left | Disc.: SDSS || 
|- id="2000 JV90" bgcolor=#d6d6d6
| 0 ||  || MBA-O || 17.36 || 1.9 km || multiple || 2000–2021 || 11 May 2021 || 60 || align=left | Disc.: SDSSAdded on 11 May 2021 || 
|- id="2000 JK91" bgcolor=#d6d6d6
| 0 ||  || MBA-O || 16.6 || 2.7 km || multiple || 2000–2020 || 18 Dec 2020 || 62 || align=left | Disc.: SDSSAdded on 22 July 2020Alt.: 2010 EP10 || 
|- id="2000 JL91" bgcolor=#E9E9E9
| 1 ||  || MBA-M || 18.83 || data-sort-value="0.72" | 720 m || multiple || 2000–2017 || 31 Jan 2017 || 23 || align=left | Disc.: SDSSAdded on 24 December 2021 || 
|- id="2000 JM91" bgcolor=#d6d6d6
| 0 ||  || MBA-O || 15.94 || 3.6 km || multiple || 2000–2021 || 14 Jul 2021 || 59 || align=left | Disc.: SDSSAdded on 11 May 2021Alt.: 2009 SB163 || 
|- id="2000 JR91" bgcolor=#d6d6d6
| 0 ||  || MBA-O || 16.85 || 2.4 km || multiple || 2000–2021 || 13 Apr 2021 || 71 || align=left | Disc.: SDSSAdded on 22 July 2020Alt.: 2010 GN19 || 
|- id="2000 JT91" bgcolor=#d6d6d6
| 0 ||  || MBA-O || 16.6 || 2.7 km || multiple || 1999–2021 || 18 Jan 2021 || 74 || align=left | Disc.: SDSSAdded on 22 July 2020Alt.: 2010 HC102 || 
|- id="2000 JU91" bgcolor=#fefefe
| 0 ||  || MBA-I || 17.4 || data-sort-value="0.98" | 980 m || multiple || 2000–2019 || 29 Nov 2019 || 165 || align=left | Disc.: SDSSAlt.: 2011 JM16 || 
|- id="2000 JV91" bgcolor=#E9E9E9
| 1 ||  || MBA-M || 17.9 || data-sort-value="0.78" | 780 m || multiple || 2000–2021 || 13 Jun 2021 || 71 || align=left | Disc.: SDSSAdded on 21 August 2021Alt.: 2021 JO40 || 
|- id="2000 JF92" bgcolor=#E9E9E9
| 0 ||  || MBA-M || 17.67 || 1.2 km || multiple || 2000–2021 || 03 May 2021 || 87 || align=left | Disc.: SDSS || 
|- id="2000 JJ92" bgcolor=#d6d6d6
| 0 ||  || MBA-O || 17.4 || 1.8 km || multiple || 2000–2021 || 12 May 2021 || 30 || align=left | Disc.: SDSSAdded on 21 August 2021 || 
|- id="2000 JQ92" bgcolor=#E9E9E9
| 0 ||  || MBA-M || 16.95 || 2.3 km || multiple || 2000–2021 || 03 Dec 2021 || 141 || align=left | Disc.: SDSS || 
|- id="2000 JF93" bgcolor=#fefefe
| 0 ||  || MBA-I || 17.9 || data-sort-value="0.78" | 780 m || multiple || 2000–2020 || 11 Dec 2020 || 44 || align=left | Disc.: SDSSAdded on 22 July 2020 || 
|- id="2000 JK93" bgcolor=#fefefe
| 0 ||  || MBA-I || 18.2 || data-sort-value="0.68" | 680 m || multiple || 2000–2018 || 16 Jun 2018 || 30 || align=left | Disc.: SDSSAlt.: 2015 UR82 || 
|- id="2000 JQ94" bgcolor=#fefefe
| 0 ||  || MBA-I || 17.3 || 1.0 km || multiple || 2000–2021 || 17 Jan 2021 || 188 || align=left | Disc.: Spacewatch || 
|- id="2000 JR94" bgcolor=#E9E9E9
| 0 ||  || MBA-M || 16.6 || 1.4 km || multiple || 2000–2020 || 21 Apr 2020 || 100 || align=left | Disc.: SDSS || 
|- id="2000 JS94" bgcolor=#d6d6d6
| 0 ||  || MBA-O || 16.03 || 3.5 km || multiple || 2000–2022 || 27 Jan 2022 || 136 || align=left | Disc.: SDSS || 
|- id="2000 JT94" bgcolor=#d6d6d6
| 0 ||  || MBA-O || 16.7 || 2.5 km || multiple || 2000–2020 || 21 May 2020 || 93 || align=left | Disc.: SDSS || 
|- id="2000 JU94" bgcolor=#E9E9E9
| 0 ||  || MBA-M || 17.29 || 1.0 km || multiple || 2000–2021 || 09 Nov 2021 || 163 || align=left | Disc.: SDSS || 
|- id="2000 JW94" bgcolor=#d6d6d6
| 0 ||  || MBA-O || 16.0 || 3.5 km || multiple || 2000–2021 || 18 Jan 2021 || 132 || align=left | Disc.: SDSS || 
|- id="2000 JZ94" bgcolor=#fefefe
| 0 ||  || MBA-I || 18.21 || data-sort-value="0.68" | 680 m || multiple || 2000–2021 || 07 Jul 2021 || 94 || align=left | Disc.: SDSS || 
|- id="2000 JB95" bgcolor=#fefefe
| 0 ||  || MBA-I || 18.51 || data-sort-value="0.59" | 590 m || multiple || 2000–2022 || 25 Jan 2022 || 127 || align=left | Disc.: SDSS || 
|- id="2000 JE95" bgcolor=#fefefe
| 0 ||  || MBA-I || 18.05 || data-sort-value="0.73" | 730 m || multiple || 2000–2021 || 11 Apr 2021 || 70 || align=left | Disc.: SDSS || 
|- id="2000 JF95" bgcolor=#d6d6d6
| 0 ||  || MBA-O || 16.64 || 2.6 km || multiple || 2000–2021 || 19 Apr 2021 || 77 || align=left | Disc.: SDSS || 
|- id="2000 JG95" bgcolor=#d6d6d6
| 0 ||  || MBA-O || 16.41 || 2.9 km || multiple || 2000–2021 || 26 Nov 2021 || 90 || align=left | Disc.: SDSS || 
|- id="2000 JJ95" bgcolor=#fefefe
| 0 ||  || MBA-I || 18.3 || data-sort-value="0.65" | 650 m || multiple || 2000–2020 || 08 Dec 2020 || 82 || align=left | Disc.: Spacewatch || 
|- id="2000 JL95" bgcolor=#fefefe
| 0 ||  = (619205) || HUN || 18.2 || data-sort-value="0.68" | 680 m || multiple || 2000–2021 || 11 Jun 2021 || 100 || align=left | Disc.: SDSS || 
|- id="2000 JM95" bgcolor=#E9E9E9
| 0 ||  || MBA-M || 17.7 || 1.2 km || multiple || 2000–2021 || 17 Jan 2021 || 97 || align=left | Disc.: SDSS || 
|- id="2000 JN95" bgcolor=#d6d6d6
| 0 ||  || MBA-O || 17.10 || 2.1 km || multiple || 2000–2022 || 25 Jan 2022 || 57 || align=left | Disc.: SDSS || 
|- id="2000 JO95" bgcolor=#fefefe
| 0 ||  || MBA-I || 17.8 || data-sort-value="0.82" | 820 m || multiple || 2000–2021 || 14 Jan 2021 || 73 || align=left | Disc.: SDSS || 
|- id="2000 JP95" bgcolor=#E9E9E9
| 1 ||  || MBA-M || 17.1 || 1.1 km || multiple || 2000–2020 || 22 Mar 2020 || 97 || align=left | Disc.: SDSS || 
|- id="2000 JQ95" bgcolor=#d6d6d6
| 0 ||  || MBA-O || 16.1 || 3.4 km || multiple || 2000–2021 || 17 Jan 2021 || 81 || align=left | Disc.: SDSS || 
|- id="2000 JR95" bgcolor=#d6d6d6
| 0 ||  || MBA-O || 16.86 || 2.4 km || multiple || 2000–2021 || 12 May 2021 || 91 || align=left | Disc.: SDSS || 
|- id="2000 JT95" bgcolor=#E9E9E9
| 0 ||  || MBA-M || 17.7 || 1.2 km || multiple || 2000–2019 || 26 Nov 2019 || 72 || align=left | Disc.: SDSS || 
|- id="2000 JU95" bgcolor=#d6d6d6
| 0 ||  || MBA-O || 16.9 || 2.3 km || multiple || 2000–2021 || 07 Jun 2021 || 65 || align=left | Disc.: SDSS || 
|- id="2000 JW95" bgcolor=#d6d6d6
| 0 ||  || MBA-O || 17.06 || 2.2 km || multiple || 2000–2021 || 04 Dec 2021 || 86 || align=left | Disc.: SDSS || 
|- id="2000 JX95" bgcolor=#E9E9E9
| 0 ||  || MBA-M || 17.83 || 1.1 km || multiple || 2000–2021 || 03 May 2021 || 52 || align=left | Disc.: SDSS || 
|- id="2000 JY95" bgcolor=#E9E9E9
| 0 ||  || MBA-M || 17.1 || 2.1 km || multiple || 2000–2019 || 25 Jul 2019 || 40 || align=left | Disc.: SDSS || 
|- id="2000 JZ95" bgcolor=#fefefe
| 0 ||  || MBA-I || 19.20 || data-sort-value="0.43" | 430 m || multiple || 2000–2021 || 13 Sep 2021 || 50 || align=left | Disc.: Spacewatch || 
|- id="2000 JA96" bgcolor=#E9E9E9
| 0 ||  || MBA-M || 17.03 || 1.2 km || multiple || 2000–2021 || 17 Jul 2021 || 82 || align=left | Disc.: SDSS || 
|- id="2000 JB96" bgcolor=#E9E9E9
| 0 ||  || MBA-M || 17.7 || 1.6 km || multiple || 2000–2020 || 16 Sep 2020 || 40 || align=left | Disc.: SDSS || 
|- id="2000 JD96" bgcolor=#E9E9E9
| 0 ||  || MBA-M || 16.9 || 1.8 km || multiple || 2000–2021 || 02 Jan 2021 || 63 || align=left | Disc.: SDSS || 
|- id="2000 JE96" bgcolor=#fefefe
| 1 ||  || MBA-I || 18.2 || data-sort-value="0.68" | 680 m || multiple || 2000–2020 || 18 Nov 2020 || 43 || align=left | Disc.: SDSS || 
|- id="2000 JF96" bgcolor=#E9E9E9
| 0 ||  || MBA-M || 17.7 || 1.2 km || multiple || 2000–2021 || 15 Jan 2021 || 38 || align=left | Disc.: SDSS || 
|- id="2000 JG96" bgcolor=#E9E9E9
| 0 ||  || MBA-M || 17.97 || 1.1 km || multiple || 2000–2021 || 02 Apr 2021 || 47 || align=left | Disc.: SDSS || 
|- id="2000 JH96" bgcolor=#d6d6d6
| 0 ||  || MBA-O || 17.2 || 2.0 km || multiple || 2000–2017 || 30 Jun 2017 || 36 || align=left | Disc.: SDSS || 
|- id="2000 JJ96" bgcolor=#d6d6d6
| 0 ||  || MBA-O || 16.3 || 3.1 km || multiple || 2000–2021 || 14 Jan 2021 || 79 || align=left | Disc.: SDSSAlt.: 2010 HO51 || 
|- id="2000 JK96" bgcolor=#fefefe
| 1 ||  || HUN || 19.3 || data-sort-value="0.41" | 410 m || multiple || 2000–2017 || 20 Nov 2017 || 30 || align=left | Disc.: SDSS || 
|- id="2000 JL96" bgcolor=#d6d6d6
| 0 ||  || MBA-O || 16.6 || 2.7 km || multiple || 2000–2019 || 28 Oct 2019 || 39 || align=left | Disc.: SDSS || 
|- id="2000 JM96" bgcolor=#E9E9E9
| 0 ||  || MBA-M || 17.44 || 1.8 km || multiple || 2000–2022 || 26 Jan 2022 || 75 || align=left | Disc.: SDSS || 
|- id="2000 JN96" bgcolor=#E9E9E9
| 0 ||  || MBA-M || 18.20 || data-sort-value="0.96" | 960 m || multiple || 2000–2021 || 09 Apr 2021 || 39 || align=left | Disc.: SDSS || 
|- id="2000 JO96" bgcolor=#E9E9E9
| 2 ||  || MBA-M || 18.4 || data-sort-value="0.88" | 880 m || multiple || 2000–2021 || 01 Jun 2021 || 36 || align=left | Disc.: SDSS || 
|- id="2000 JP96" bgcolor=#E9E9E9
| 0 ||  || MBA-M || 16.6 || 2.0 km || multiple || 2000–2021 || 18 Jan 2021 || 139 || align=left | Disc.: SDSS || 
|- id="2000 JQ96" bgcolor=#d6d6d6
| 0 ||  || MBA-O || 16.0 || 3.5 km || multiple || 2000–2021 || 17 Jan 2021 || 104 || align=left | Disc.: SDSS || 
|- id="2000 JR96" bgcolor=#fefefe
| 0 ||  || MBA-I || 18.0 || data-sort-value="0.75" | 750 m || multiple || 2000–2020 || 17 Nov 2020 || 91 || align=left | Disc.: Spacewatch || 
|- id="2000 JS96" bgcolor=#E9E9E9
| 0 ||  || MBA-M || 17.38 || 1.4 km || multiple || 2000–2021 || 08 Apr 2021 || 84 || align=left | Disc.: SDSS || 
|- id="2000 JT96" bgcolor=#d6d6d6
| 0 ||  || HIL || 15.63 || 4.2 km || multiple || 2000–2022 || 27 Jan 2022 || 98 || align=left | Disc.: Astrovirtel || 
|- id="2000 JU96" bgcolor=#d6d6d6
| 0 ||  || MBA-O || 16.6 || 2.7 km || multiple || 2000–2021 || 15 Jan 2021 || 74 || align=left | Disc.: SDSS || 
|- id="2000 JV96" bgcolor=#fefefe
| 0 ||  || MBA-I || 18.0 || data-sort-value="0.75" | 750 m || multiple || 2000–2021 || 18 Jan 2021 || 71 || align=left | Disc.: SDSS || 
|- id="2000 JW96" bgcolor=#d6d6d6
| 0 ||  || MBA-O || 16.4 || 2.9 km || multiple || 2000–2021 || 15 Jan 2021 || 88 || align=left | Disc.: SDSS || 
|- id="2000 JX96" bgcolor=#fefefe
| 0 ||  || MBA-I || 18.08 || data-sort-value="0.72" | 720 m || multiple || 2000–2021 || 03 May 2021 || 81 || align=left | Disc.: SDSS || 
|- id="2000 JY96" bgcolor=#fefefe
| 0 ||  || HUN || 18.3 || data-sort-value="0.65" | 650 m || multiple || 2000–2020 || 14 Dec 2020 || 129 || align=left | Disc.: SDSS || 
|- id="2000 JZ96" bgcolor=#d6d6d6
| 0 ||  || MBA-O || 16.69 || 2.6 km || multiple || 2000–2021 || 17 Apr 2021 || 85 || align=left | Disc.: SDSSAlt.: 2010 HN12 || 
|- id="2000 JA97" bgcolor=#d6d6d6
| 0 ||  || MBA-O || 16.4 || 2.9 km || multiple || 2000–2021 || 09 Jan 2021 || 59 || align=left | Disc.: SDSS || 
|- id="2000 JB97" bgcolor=#d6d6d6
| 0 ||  || MBA-O || 16.2 || 3.2 km || multiple || 2000–2021 || 15 Jan 2021 || 53 || align=left | Disc.: SDSS || 
|- id="2000 JC97" bgcolor=#fefefe
| 0 ||  || MBA-I || 18.5 || data-sort-value="0.59" | 590 m || multiple || 2000–2018 || 03 Oct 2018 || 46 || align=left | Disc.: Spacewatch || 
|- id="2000 JE97" bgcolor=#d6d6d6
| 0 ||  || MBA-O || 16.4 || 2.9 km || multiple || 2000–2019 || 03 Dec 2019 || 51 || align=left | Disc.: SDSS || 
|- id="2000 JH97" bgcolor=#E9E9E9
| 0 ||  || MBA-M || 17.87 || 1.1 km || multiple || 2000–2021 || 12 May 2021 || 66 || align=left | Disc.: SDSS || 
|- id="2000 JJ97" bgcolor=#fefefe
| 0 ||  || MBA-I || 18.1 || data-sort-value="0.71" | 710 m || multiple || 2000–2019 || 29 Jul 2019 || 32 || align=left | Disc.: SDSS || 
|- id="2000 JK97" bgcolor=#fefefe
| 0 ||  || MBA-I || 18.42 || data-sort-value="0.62" | 620 m || multiple || 2000–2021 || 08 Sep 2021 || 57 || align=left | Disc.: SDSS || 
|- id="2000 JL97" bgcolor=#E9E9E9
| 0 ||  || MBA-M || 17.2 || 1.1 km || multiple || 2000–2015 || 17 Jan 2015 || 36 || align=left | Disc.: SDSS || 
|- id="2000 JM97" bgcolor=#E9E9E9
| 0 ||  || MBA-M || 17.86 || 1.5 km || multiple || 2000–2020 || 19 Oct 2020 || 44 || align=left | Disc.: SDSS || 
|- id="2000 JN97" bgcolor=#E9E9E9
| 0 ||  || MBA-M || 17.5 || 1.3 km || multiple || 2000–2018 || 08 Aug 2018 || 29 || align=left | Disc.: SDSS || 
|- id="2000 JO97" bgcolor=#E9E9E9
| 0 ||  || MBA-M || 17.9 || 1.1 km || multiple || 2000–2018 || 07 Sep 2018 || 29 || align=left | Disc.: SDSS || 
|- id="2000 JP97" bgcolor=#fefefe
| 0 ||  || MBA-I || 17.38 || data-sort-value="0.99" | 990 m || multiple || 1993–2022 || 24 Jan 2022 || 262 || align=left | Disc.: SDSS || 
|- id="2000 JQ97" bgcolor=#fefefe
| 0 ||  || MBA-I || 18.4 || data-sort-value="0.62" | 620 m || multiple || 2000–2020 || 15 Sep 2020 || 59 || align=left | Disc.: SDSS || 
|- id="2000 JR97" bgcolor=#fefefe
| 0 ||  || MBA-I || 18.1 || data-sort-value="0.71" | 710 m || multiple || 2000–2019 || 25 Oct 2019 || 52 || align=left | Disc.: SDSS || 
|- id="2000 JS97" bgcolor=#d6d6d6
| 0 ||  || MBA-O || 17.17 || 2.0 km || multiple || 2000–2021 || 02 Dec 2021 || 77 || align=left | Disc.: SDSS || 
|- id="2000 JT97" bgcolor=#E9E9E9
| 0 ||  || MBA-M || 17.2 || 2.0 km || multiple || 2000–2020 || 16 Nov 2020 || 54 || align=left | Disc.: SDSS || 
|- id="2000 JU97" bgcolor=#E9E9E9
| 2 ||  || MBA-M || 17.8 || data-sort-value="0.82" | 820 m || multiple || 2000–2020 || 03 Jan 2020 || 29 || align=left | Disc.: SDSS || 
|- id="2000 JV97" bgcolor=#d6d6d6
| 0 ||  || MBA-O || 16.5 || 2.8 km || multiple || 2000–2019 || 30 Nov 2019 || 45 || align=left | Disc.: SDSS || 
|- id="2000 JW97" bgcolor=#d6d6d6
| 0 ||  || MBA-O || 16.2 || 3.2 km || multiple || 2000–2020 || 20 Jan 2020 || 39 || align=left | Disc.: SDSS || 
|- id="2000 JX97" bgcolor=#fefefe
| 0 ||  || MBA-I || 18.18 || data-sort-value="0.69" | 690 m || multiple || 2000–2021 || 12 May 2021 || 56 || align=left | Disc.: SDSS || 
|- id="2000 JY97" bgcolor=#E9E9E9
| 0 ||  || MBA-M || 17.23 || 1.5 km || multiple || 2000–2021 || 17 Apr 2021 || 87 || align=left | Disc.: SDSS || 
|- id="2000 JZ97" bgcolor=#d6d6d6
| 0 ||  || MBA-O || 16.16 || 3.3 km || multiple || 2000–2021 || 01 Apr 2021 || 95 || align=left | Disc.: SDSSAlt.: 2010 JN5 || 
|- id="2000 JA98" bgcolor=#d6d6d6
| 0 ||  || MBA-O || 16.5 || 2.8 km || multiple || 2000–2020 || 08 Dec 2020 || 54 || align=left | Disc.: SDSS || 
|- id="2000 JB98" bgcolor=#d6d6d6
| 0 ||  || MBA-O || 16.83 || 2.4 km || multiple || 2000–2021 || 14 Apr 2021 || 88 || align=left | Disc.: SDSSAlt.: 2010 LM2 || 
|- id="2000 JC98" bgcolor=#E9E9E9
| 1 ||  || MBA-M || 17.5 || 1.3 km || multiple || 2000–2019 || 17 Dec 2019 || 38 || align=left | Disc.: SDSS || 
|- id="2000 JD98" bgcolor=#fefefe
| 4 ||  || MBA-I || 18.8 || data-sort-value="0.52" | 520 m || multiple || 2000–2021 || 15 Apr 2021 || 29 || align=left | Disc.: SpacewatchAdded on 17 June 2021 || 
|- id="2000 JE98" bgcolor=#E9E9E9
| 2 ||  || MBA-M || 18.6 || data-sort-value="0.80" | 800 m || multiple || 2000–2021 || 18 Apr 2021 || 23 || align=left | Disc.: SDSSAdded on 11 May 2021 || 
|}
back to top

K 

|- id="2000 KA" bgcolor=#FFC2E0
| 0 || 2000 KA || APO || 21.7 || data-sort-value="0.16" | 160 m || multiple || 2000–2020 || 21 Jun 2020 || 464 || align=left | Disc.: LONEOSPotentially hazardous object || 
|- id="2000 KC" bgcolor=#FFC2E0
| 1 || 2000 KC || AMO || 20.1 || data-sort-value="0.34" | 340 m || multiple || 2000–2017 || 14 Aug 2017 || 63 || align=left | Disc.: LONEOS || 
|- id="2000 KB3" bgcolor=#fefefe
| 0 ||  || HUN || 18.1 || data-sort-value="0.71" | 710 m || multiple || 2000–2021 || 16 Jan 2021 || 119 || align=left | Disc.: Spacewatch || 
|- id="2000 KK4" bgcolor=#C2E0FF
| 2 ||  || TNO || 6.4 || 218 km || multiple || 2000–2017 || 27 Aug 2017 || 54 || align=left | Disc.: Kitt Peak Obs.LoUTNOs, other TNO, BR-mag: 1.55; taxonomy: U || 
|- id="2000 KL4" bgcolor=#C2E0FF
| 3 ||  || TNO || 7.6 || 126 km || multiple || 2000–2019 || 06 Jun 2019 || 23 || align=left | Disc.: Kitt Peak Obs.LoUTNOs, other TNO || 
|- id="2000 KQ4" bgcolor=#FA8072
| – ||  || MCA || 19.5 || data-sort-value="0.37" | 370 m || single || 9 days || 05 Jun 2000 || 14 || align=left | Disc.: LINEAR || 
|- id="2000 KV8" bgcolor=#d6d6d6
| 1 ||  || MBA-O || 16.8 || 2.4 km || multiple || 2000–2021 || 09 Apr 2021 || 38 || align=left | Disc.: LINEARAlt.: 2016 EH294 || 
|- id="2000 KN14" bgcolor=#fefefe
| 0 ||  || MBA-I || 17.6 || data-sort-value="0.90" | 900 m || multiple || 1996–2021 || 16 Jan 2021 || 109 || align=left | Disc.: LINEARAlt.: 2007 EU191 || 
|- id="2000 KX27" bgcolor=#E9E9E9
| 0 ||  || MBA-M || 16.9 || 1.8 km || multiple || 2000–2018 || 07 Nov 2018 || 88 || align=left | Disc.: LINEARAlt.: 2018 RD12 || 
|- id="2000 KL33" bgcolor=#FFC2E0
| 1 ||  || AMO || 19.7 || data-sort-value="0.41" | 410 m || multiple || 2000–2003 || 03 May 2003 || 157 || align=left | Disc.: LINEAR || 
|- id="2000 KZ35" bgcolor=#fefefe
| 0 ||  || MBA-I || 17.5 || data-sort-value="0.94" | 940 m || multiple || 2000–2021 || 17 Jan 2021 || 83 || align=left | Disc.: LINEARAlt.: 2015 TD38 || 
|- id="2000 KW36" bgcolor=#d6d6d6
| 0 ||  || MBA-O || 16.56 || 2.8 km || multiple || 2000–2022 || 31 Jul 2022 || 64 || align=left | Disc.: LINEAR || 
|- id="2000 KK38" bgcolor=#d6d6d6
| 0 ||  || MBA-O || 16.56 || 2.7 km || multiple || 2000–2021 || 12 May 2021 || 100 || align=left | Disc.: Spacewatch || 
|- id="2000 KP39" bgcolor=#d6d6d6
| 0 ||  || MBA-O || 15.50 || 4.4 km || multiple || 2000–2021 || 02 Apr 2021 || 154 || align=left | Disc.: Spacewatch || 
|- id="2000 KQ40" bgcolor=#d6d6d6
| 0 ||  || MBA-O || 16.55 || 2.7 km || multiple || 2000–2021 || 14 Apr 2021 || 78 || align=left | Disc.: Spacewatch || 
|- id="2000 KE41" bgcolor=#FFC2E0
| 0 ||  || APO || 17.44 || 1.2 km || multiple || 2000-2021 || 04 May 2021 || 160 || align=left | Disc.: LINEARNEO larger than 1 kilometer || 
|- id="2000 KN43" bgcolor=#fefefe
| 0 ||  || MBA-I || 18.1 || data-sort-value="0.71" | 710 m || multiple || 2000–2019 || 27 Aug 2019 || 61 || align=left | Disc.: SpacewatchAdded on 21 August 2021Alt.: 2008 RB67 || 
|- id="2000 KJ44" bgcolor=#fefefe
| 0 ||  || MBA-I || 18.0 || data-sort-value="0.75" | 750 m || multiple || 1996–2020 || 08 Dec 2020 || 76 || align=left | Disc.: Spacewatch || 
|- id="2000 KP44" bgcolor=#FFC2E0
| 2 ||  || APO || 19.03 || data-sort-value="0.56" | 560 m || multiple || 2000–2021 || 16 May 2021 || 90 || align=left | Disc.: LONEOS || 
|- id="2000 KA45" bgcolor=#fefefe
| 0 ||  || MBA-I || 18.3 || data-sort-value="0.65" | 650 m || multiple || 2000–2018 || 06 Oct 2018 || 67 || align=left | Disc.: Spacewatch || 
|- id="2000 KW49" bgcolor=#E9E9E9
| 0 ||  || MBA-M || 17.50 || 1.8 km || multiple || 2000–2022 || 27 Jan 2022 || 61 || align=left | Disc.: SpacewatchAlt.: 2010 MN117 || 
|- id="2000 KX49" bgcolor=#d6d6d6
| 0 ||  || MBA-O || 16.91 || 2.3 km || multiple || 2000–2018 || 05 Oct 2018 || 43 || align=left | Disc.: SpacewatchAdded on 24 December 2021 || 
|- id="2000 KL57" bgcolor=#d6d6d6
| 0 ||  || MBA-O || 16.0 || 3.5 km || multiple || 2000–2019 || 24 Dec 2019 || 83 || align=left | Disc.: SpacewatchAlt.: 2008 SH192 || 
|- id="2000 KP65" bgcolor=#C2E0FF
| 2 ||  || TNO || 10.5 || 48 km || single || 58 days || 11 Jun 2000 || 20 || align=left | Disc.: LONEOSLoUTNOs, damocloid || 
|- id="2000 KM68" bgcolor=#E9E9E9
| 0 ||  || MBA-M || 16.9 || 1.8 km || multiple || 2000–2021 || 11 Jan 2021 || 74 || align=left | Disc.: LINEARAlt.: 2014 RY43, 2017 DA107 || 
|- id="2000 KY68" bgcolor=#fefefe
| 0 ||  || MBA-I || 17.8 || data-sort-value="0.82" | 820 m || multiple || 2000–2021 || 11 Jun 2021 || 203 || align=left | Disc.: SpacewatchAlt.: 2010 GS93 || 
|- id="2000 KJ69" bgcolor=#fefefe
| 0 ||  || MBA-I || 17.9 || data-sort-value="0.78" | 780 m || multiple || 2000–2019 || 22 Aug 2019 || 67 || align=left | Disc.: SpacewatchAlt.: 2011 HA58, 2013 YJ115 || 
|- id="2000 KK69" bgcolor=#E9E9E9
| 0 ||  || MBA-M || 17.54 || 1.3 km || multiple || 2000–2021 || 30 Jul 2021 || 72 || align=left | Disc.: Spacewatch || 
|- id="2000 KT81" bgcolor=#E9E9E9
| 0 ||  || MBA-M || 18.00 || 1.1 km || multiple || 2000–2021 || 10 Apr 2021 || 67 || align=left | Disc.: SpacewatchAdded on 17 January 2021Alt.: 2015 XK423 || 
|- id="2000 KA84" bgcolor=#E9E9E9
| 0 ||  || MBA-M || 17.85 || 1.1 km || multiple || 2000–2021 || 11 Jun 2021 || 207 || align=left | Disc.: Mauna Kea Obs.Alt.: 2006 WQ96, 2008 FJ13, 2016 BU41 || 
|- id="2000 KB84" bgcolor=#E9E9E9
| 0 ||  || MBA-M || 17.3 || 1.9 km || multiple || 2000–2020 || 18 Dec 2020 || 32 || align=left | Disc.: Mauna Kea Obs.Added on 29 January 2022 || 
|- id="2000 KG84" bgcolor=#fefefe
| 0 ||  || MBA-I || 17.9 || data-sort-value="0.78" | 780 m || multiple || 2000–2020 || 16 Mar 2020 || 83 || align=left | Disc.: Mauna Kea Obs. || 
|- id="2000 KH84" bgcolor=#d6d6d6
| 0 ||  || MBA-O || 17.33 || 1.9 km || multiple || 2000–2021 || 14 Apr 2021 || 84 || align=left | Disc.: Mauna Kea Obs.Added on 22 July 2020Alt.: 2005 JA11, 2015 BT451, 2018 UG25 || 
|- id="2000 KJ84" bgcolor=#fefefe
| 9 ||  || MBA-I || 19.89 || data-sort-value="0.31" | 310 m || single || 2 days || 01 Jun 2000 || 12 || align=left | Disc.: La Palma Obs.Added on 21 August 2021 || 
|- id="2000 KL84" bgcolor=#d6d6d6
| 0 ||  || MBA-O || 16.17 || 3.2 km || multiple || 2000–2022 || 08 Jan 2022 || 156 || align=left | Disc.: La Palma Obs. || 
|- id="2000 KR84" bgcolor=#fefefe
| 0 ||  || MBA-I || 18.17 || data-sort-value="0.69" | 690 m || multiple || 2000–2021 || 15 Apr 2021 || 82 || align=left | Disc.: Spacewatch || 
|- id="2000 KS84" bgcolor=#d6d6d6
| 0 ||  || MBA-O || 16.23 || 3.2 km || multiple || 2000–2021 || 03 Aug 2021 || 160 || align=left | Disc.: SpacewatchAlt.: 2007 VY375 || 
|- id="2000 KT84" bgcolor=#fefefe
| 0 ||  || MBA-I || 18.4 || data-sort-value="0.62" | 620 m || multiple || 2000–2020 || 02 Feb 2020 || 53 || align=left | Disc.: Spacewatch || 
|- id="2000 KU84" bgcolor=#fefefe
| 0 ||  || MBA-I || 18.1 || data-sort-value="0.71" | 710 m || multiple || 1993–2019 || 28 Aug 2019 || 53 || align=left | Disc.: Spacewatch || 
|- id="2000 KW84" bgcolor=#fefefe
| 0 ||  || MBA-I || 18.5 || data-sort-value="0.59" | 590 m || multiple || 2000–2019 || 24 Aug 2019 || 34 || align=left | Disc.: Spacewatch || 
|- id="2000 KX84" bgcolor=#fefefe
| 0 ||  || MBA-I || 18.0 || data-sort-value="0.75" | 750 m || multiple || 2000–2019 || 02 Nov 2019 || 54 || align=left | Disc.: DB MissingAdded on 22 July 2020 || 
|}
back to top

L 

|- id="2000 LK" bgcolor=#FFC2E0
| 1 || 2000 LK || APO || 18.3 || data-sort-value="0.78" | 780 m || multiple || 2000–2020 || 22 Apr 2020 || 111 || align=left | Disc.: LONEOSAlt.: 2007 FD1 || 
|- id="2000 LG2" bgcolor=#fefefe
| 0 ||  || MBA-I || 19.1 || data-sort-value="0.45" | 450 m || multiple || 2000–2020 || 28 May 2020 || 29 || align=left | Disc.: Mauna Kea Obs.Added on 22 July 2020 || 
|- id="2000 LH2" bgcolor=#d6d6d6
| 0 ||  || MBA-O || 17.4 || 1.8 km || multiple || 2000–2021 || 08 Sep 2021 || 49 || align=left | Disc.: Mauna Kea Obs.Added on 22 July 2020Alt.: 2014 EZ156 || 
|- id="2000 LQ2" bgcolor=#E9E9E9
| 0 ||  || MBA-M || 17.4 || 1.4 km || multiple || 2000–2018 || 09 Nov 2018 || 72 || align=left | Disc.: SpacewatchAlt.: 2014 UD188 || 
|- id="2000 LD3" bgcolor=#FFC2E0
| 6 ||  || APO || 19.6 || data-sort-value="0.43" | 430 m || single || 12 days || 15 Jun 2000 || 41 || align=left | Disc.: LONEOS || 
|- id="2000 LF3" bgcolor=#FFC2E0
| 4 ||  || APO || 21.6 || data-sort-value="0.17" | 170 m || single || 12 days || 17 Jun 2000 || 67 || align=left | Disc.: LONEOSPotentially hazardous object || 
|- id="2000 LG6" bgcolor=#FFC2E0
| 6 ||  || ATE || 29.0 || data-sort-value="0.0056" | 6 m || single || 3 days || 07 Jun 2000 || 13 || align=left | Disc.: Spacewatch || 
|- id="2000 LM6" bgcolor=#d6d6d6
| 0 ||  || MBA-O || 16.86 || 2.4 km || multiple || 2000–2022 || 25 Jan 2022 || 88 || align=left | Disc.: Mauna Kea Obs.Added on 22 July 2020 || 
|- id="2000 LG10" bgcolor=#fefefe
| 0 ||  || MBA-I || 17.62 || data-sort-value="0.89" | 890 m || multiple || 2000–2021 || 03 Dec 2021 || 324 || align=left | Disc.: Mauna Kea Obs. || 
|- id="2000 LK10" bgcolor=#FFC2E0
| 1 ||  || AMO || 19.5 || data-sort-value="0.45" | 450 m || multiple || 2000–2019 || 20 Dec 2019 || 46 || align=left | Disc.: Spacewatch || 
|- id="2000 LP26" bgcolor=#E9E9E9
| 2 ||  || MBA-M || 17.3 || 1.0 km || multiple || 2000–2020 || 12 Jul 2020 || 96 || align=left | Disc.: Spacewatch || 
|- id="2000 LO29" bgcolor=#E9E9E9
| 0 ||  || MBA-M || 17.31 || 1.5 km || multiple || 2000–2021 || 15 May 2021 || 125 || align=left | Disc.: AMOS || 
|- id="2000 LZ37" bgcolor=#E9E9E9
| 0 ||  || MBA-M || 18.01 || 1.1 km || multiple || 2000–2021 || 09 Apr 2021 || 43 || align=left | Disc.: Spacewatch || 
|- id="2000 LA38" bgcolor=#d6d6d6
| 0 ||  || MBA-O || 16.57 || 2.7 km || multiple || 2000–2021 || 10 May 2021 || 122 || align=left | Disc.: SpacewatchAlt.: 2010 HL44 || 
|}
back to top

M 

|- id="2000 MO" bgcolor=#FA8072
| – || 2000 MO || MCA || 19.5 || data-sort-value="0.37" | 370 m || single || 2 days || 25 Jun 2000 || 9 || align=left | Disc.: Spacewatch || 
|- id="2000 ME7" bgcolor=#E9E9E9
| 0 ||  || MBA-M || 17.93 || 1.1 km || multiple || 2000–2021 || 15 Apr 2021 || 64 || align=left | Disc.: AstrovirtelAdded on 22 July 2020Alt.: 2014 SP30 || 
|- id="2000 MJ7" bgcolor=#d6d6d6
| 0 ||  || MBA-O || 16.2 || 3.2 km || multiple || 2000–2019 || 25 Nov 2019 || 89 || align=left | Disc.: Astrovirtel || 
|- id="2000 MK7" bgcolor=#E9E9E9
| 1 ||  || MBA-M || 18.10 || 1.3 km || multiple || 2000–2022 || 25 Jan 2022 || 43 || align=left | Disc.: AstrovirtelAlt.: 2015 PH174 || 
|- id="2000 ML7" bgcolor=#d6d6d6
| 0 ||  || MBA-O || 17.0 || 2.2 km || multiple || 2000–2018 || 17 Aug 2018 || 40 || align=left | Disc.: Astrovirtel || 
|- id="2000 MQ7" bgcolor=#d6d6d6
| 0 ||  || MBA-O || 16.46 || 2.8 km || multiple || 2000–2022 || 27 Jan 2022 || 121 || align=left | Disc.: Spacewatch || 
|- id="2000 MR7" bgcolor=#d6d6d6
| 0 ||  || MBA-O || 15.5 || 4.4 km || multiple || 2000–2021 || 18 Jan 2021 || 146 || align=left | Disc.: Spacewatch || 
|- id="2000 MS7" bgcolor=#d6d6d6
| 0 ||  || MBA-O || 15.9 || 3.7 km || multiple || 2000–2020 || 20 Dec 2020 || 102 || align=left | Disc.: Spacewatch || 
|- id="2000 MT7" bgcolor=#d6d6d6
| 0 ||  || MBA-O || 16.2 || 3.2 km || multiple || 1995–2020 || 27 Apr 2020 || 85 || align=left | Disc.: Spacewatch || 
|- id="2000 MU7" bgcolor=#fefefe
| 0 ||  || MBA-I || 18.1 || data-sort-value="0.71" | 710 m || multiple || 2000–2019 || 25 Sep 2019 || 65 || align=left | Disc.: Astrovirtel || 
|- id="2000 MV7" bgcolor=#d6d6d6
| 0 ||  || MBA-O || 17.0 || 2.2 km || multiple || 2000–2020 || 15 May 2020 || 46 || align=left | Disc.: Astrovirtel || 
|}
back to top

N 

|- id="2000 NG1" bgcolor=#E9E9E9
| 0 ||  = (619206) || MBA-M || 17.3 || 1.5 km || multiple || 2000–2020 || 22 Mar 2020 || 52 || align=left | Disc.: Spacewatch || 
|- id="2000 NL1" bgcolor=#E9E9E9
| 0 ||  || MBA-M || 17.84 || data-sort-value="0.80" | 800 m || multiple || 2000–2022 || 06 Jan 2022 || 85 || align=left | Disc.: SpacewatchAdded on 17 January 2021 || 
|- id="2000 NW3" bgcolor=#FA8072
| 1 ||  || MCA || 19.33 || data-sort-value="0.45" | 420 m || multiple || 2000-2022 || 19 Sep 2022 || 49 || align=left | Disc.: Prescott Obs. Alt.: 2022 KV8 || 
|- id="2000 NF6" bgcolor=#fefefe
| 0 ||  || MBA-I || 18.5 || data-sort-value="0.59" | 590 m || multiple || 2000–2020 || 16 Oct 2020 || 128 || align=left | Disc.: SpacewatchAdded on 22 July 2020Alt.: 2016 FS33 || 
|- id="2000 NN7" bgcolor=#E9E9E9
| 0 ||  || MBA-M || 17.0 || 2.2 km || multiple || 2000–2021 || 04 Jan 2021 || 104 || align=left | Disc.: Spacewatch || 
|- id="2000 NQ11" bgcolor=#FFC2E0
| 2 ||  || AMO || 19.6 || data-sort-value="0.43" | 430 m || multiple || 2000–2006 || 25 Nov 2006 || 81 || align=left | Disc.: AMOS || 
|- id="2000 NW29" bgcolor=#E9E9E9
| 0 ||  || MBA-M || 17.5 || 1.3 km || multiple || 2000–2020 || 27 Feb 2020 || 57 || align=left | Disc.: Spacewatch || 
|- id="2000 NX29" bgcolor=#fefefe
| 0 ||  || MBA-I || 17.7 || data-sort-value="0.86" | 860 m || multiple || 2000–2019 || 27 Oct 2019 || 67 || align=left | Disc.: Spacewatch || 
|- id="2000 NY29" bgcolor=#E9E9E9
| 0 ||  || MBA-M || 17.80 || data-sort-value="0.82" | 820 m || multiple || 2000–2021 || 25 Nov 2021 || 131 || align=left | Disc.: Spacewatch || 
|- id="2000 NZ29" bgcolor=#E9E9E9
| 0 ||  || MBA-M || 17.57 || 1.3 km || multiple || 2000–2021 || 31 May 2021 || 62 || align=left | Disc.: Spacewatch || 
|- id="2000 NA30" bgcolor=#E9E9E9
| 0 ||  || MBA-M || 17.5 || 1.8 km || multiple || 2000–2019 || 26 Sep 2019 || 34 || align=left | Disc.: Astrovirtel || 
|}
back to top

O 

|- id="2000 OE2" bgcolor=#E9E9E9
| 1 ||  || MBA-M || 17.3 || 1.5 km || multiple || 2000–2018 || 05 Oct 2018 || 40 || align=left | Disc.: Prescott Obs. || 
|- id="2000 OX2" bgcolor=#fefefe
| – ||  || MBA-I || 19.1 || data-sort-value="0.45" | 450 m || single || 30 days || 05 Aug 2000 || 17 || align=left | Disc.: Mount John || 
|- id="2000 OH8" bgcolor=#FFC2E0
| 5 ||  || AMO || 20.8 || data-sort-value="0.25" | 250 m || single || 74 days || 19 Sep 2000 || 83 || align=left | Disc.: LINEAR || 
|- id="2000 OK8" bgcolor=#FFC2E0
| 3 ||  || ATE || 20.2 || data-sort-value="0.32" | 320 m || multiple || 2000–2002 || 28 Aug 2002 || 188 || align=left | Disc.: LINEAR || 
|- id="2000 OO8" bgcolor=#E9E9E9
| 0 ||  || MBA-M || 16.79 || 1.8 km || multiple || 2000–2021 || 18 Apr 2021 || 112 || align=left | Disc.: LINEAR || 
|- id="2000 OZ21" bgcolor=#FFE699
| – ||  || Asteroid || 16.3 || 3.0 km || single || 5 days || 03 Aug 2000 || 15 || align=left | Disc.: LONEOSMBA at MPC || 
|- id="2000 OA22" bgcolor=#FA8072
| 1 ||  || MCA || 18.3 || 1.2 km || multiple || 2000–2019 || 04 Jan 2019 || 388 || align=left | Disc.: LONEOS || 
|- id="2000 OB51" bgcolor=#C2E0FF
| 5 ||  || TNO || 8.03 || 103 km || multiple || 1999–2021 || 08 Aug 2021 || 21 || align=left | Disc.: La Silla Obs.LoUTNOs, other TNO || 
|- id="2000 OD57" bgcolor=#fefefe
| 1 ||  || MBA-I || 17.7 || data-sort-value="0.86" | 860 m || multiple || 2000–2021 || 09 Jun 2021 || 70 || align=left | Disc.: LONEOSAlt.: 2010 LK58, 2011 UN280 || 
|- id="2000 OS57" bgcolor=#FA8072
| 0 ||  || MCA || 18.2 || data-sort-value="0.68" | 680 m || multiple || 2000–2020 || 15 Jun 2020 || 87 || align=left | Disc.: LONEOSAlt.: 2017 SG113 || 
|- id="2000 OM61" bgcolor=#fefefe
| 2 ||  || MBA-I || 18.9 || data-sort-value="0.49" | 490 m || multiple || 2000–2019 || 19 Dec 2019 || 28 || align=left | Disc.: Cerro Tololo || 
|- id="2000 ON61" bgcolor=#E9E9E9
| 0 ||  || MBA-M || 18.1 || 1.3 km || multiple || 2000–2017 || 20 Apr 2017 || 41 || align=left | Disc.: Cerro TololoAlt.: 2008 GE71 || 
|- id="2000 OS61" bgcolor=#d6d6d6
| 1 ||  || MBA-O || 17.7 || 1.6 km || multiple || 2000–2017 || 29 Sep 2017 || 33 || align=left | Disc.: Cerro TololoAlt.: 2006 SJ179 || 
|- id="2000 OD62" bgcolor=#E9E9E9
| 0 ||  || MBA-M || 17.7 || 1.2 km || multiple || 2000–2021 || 09 May 2021 || 65 || align=left | Disc.: Cerro TololoAlt.: 2014 WW125 || 
|- id="2000 OH62" bgcolor=#d6d6d6
| 0 ||  || MBA-O || 16.73 || 2.5 km || multiple || 2000–2021 || 30 May 2021 || 83 || align=left | Disc.: Cerro TololoAdded on 22 July 2020 || 
|- id="2000 OQ62" bgcolor=#fefefe
| 0 ||  || MBA-I || 18.0 || data-sort-value="0.75" | 750 m || multiple || 2000–2019 || 03 Oct 2019 || 199 || align=left | Disc.: Cerro TololoAlt.: 2004 RO300, 2015 RK4, 2017 DV52 || 
|- id="2000 OA63" bgcolor=#fefefe
| 0 ||  || MBA-I || 18.60 || data-sort-value="0.57" | 570 m || multiple || 2000–2021 || 04 Oct 2021 || 76 || align=left | Disc.: Cerro Tololo || 
|- id="2000 OE63" bgcolor=#d6d6d6
| 2 ||  || MBA-O || 17.8 || 1.5 km || multiple || 2000–2017 || 22 Oct 2017 || 26 || align=left | Disc.: Cerro Tololo || 
|- id="2000 OT63" bgcolor=#fefefe
| 0 ||  || MBA-I || 18.5 || data-sort-value="0.59" | 590 m || multiple || 2000–2020 || 12 Sep 2020 || 40 || align=left | Disc.: Cerro TololoAdded on 19 October 2020 || 
|- id="2000 OU63" bgcolor=#fefefe
| 0 ||  || MBA-I || 18.1 || data-sort-value="0.71" | 710 m || multiple || 2000–2020 || 23 Oct 2020 || 59 || align=left | Disc.: Cerro TololoAlt.: 2015 KC127 || 
|- id="2000 OM64" bgcolor=#d6d6d6
| 1 ||  || MBA-O || 17.2 || 2.0 km || multiple || 2000–2019 || 07 Apr 2019 || 23 || align=left | Disc.: Cerro TololoAdded on 22 July 2020 || 
|- id="2000 ON64" bgcolor=#d6d6d6
| 2 ||  || MBA-O || 18.67 || 1.0 km || multiple || 2000–2021 || 08 Sep 2021 || 26 || align=left | Disc.: Cerro TololoAdded on 30 September 2021 || 
|- id="2000 OT64" bgcolor=#fefefe
| 0 ||  || MBA-I || 18.8 || data-sort-value="0.52" | 520 m || multiple || 2000–2020 || 27 Jan 2020 || 47 || align=left | Disc.: Cerro TololoAdded on 17 January 2021Alt.: 2015 VN189 || 
|- id="2000 OV64" bgcolor=#d6d6d6
| – ||  || MBA-O || 17.5 || 1.8 km || single || 26 days || 26 Aug 2000 || 6 || align=left | Disc.: Cerro Tololo || 
|- id="2000 OB65" bgcolor=#E9E9E9
| 0 ||  || MBA-M || 18.3 || data-sort-value="0.92" | 920 m || multiple || 2000–2017 || 24 Aug 2017 || 35 || align=left | Disc.: Cerro TololoAdded on 21 August 2021Alt.: 2013 PT106 || 
|- id="2000 OD65" bgcolor=#fefefe
| 1 ||  || MBA-I || 18.7 || data-sort-value="0.52" | 560 m || multiple || 2000-2021 || 20 Mar 2021 || 34 || align=left | Disc.: Cerro Tololo Alt.: 2005 YP239 || 
|- id="2000 OF65" bgcolor=#fefefe
| 0 ||  || MBA-I || 19.1 || data-sort-value="0.45" | 450 m || multiple || 2000–2017 || 17 Aug 2017 || 36 || align=left | Disc.: Cerro TololoAlt.: 2016 CA156 || 
|- id="2000 OM65" bgcolor=#fefefe
| 0 ||  || MBA-I || 18.91 || data-sort-value="0.49" | 490 m || multiple || 2000–2021 || 13 Sep 2021 || 45 || align=left | Disc.: Cerro TololoAlt.: 2014 QR144 || 
|- id="2000 OP65" bgcolor=#E9E9E9
| 0 ||  || MBA-M || 17.5 || 1.8 km || multiple || 2000–2019 || 03 Dec 2019 || 67 || align=left | Disc.: Cerro TololoAlt.: 2016 CB162 || 
|- id="2000 OS65" bgcolor=#fefefe
| 0 ||  || MBA-I || 18.3 || data-sort-value="0.65" | 650 m || multiple || 2000–2019 || 02 Nov 2019 || 25 || align=left | Disc.: Cerro Tololo || 
|- id="2000 OG66" bgcolor=#E9E9E9
| 0 ||  || MBA-M || 17.7 || 1.6 km || multiple || 2000–2019 || 03 Dec 2019 || 54 || align=left | Disc.: Cerro TololoAlt.: 2005 TT93 || 
|- id="2000 OL66" bgcolor=#E9E9E9
| 0 ||  || MBA-M || 17.4 || 1.8 km || multiple || 2000–2020 || 11 Dec 2020 || 57 || align=left | Disc.: Cerro Tololo || 
|- id="2000 OQ66" bgcolor=#d6d6d6
| 2 ||  || MBA-O || 17.6 || 1.7 km || multiple || 2000–2017 || 17 Aug 2017 || 21 || align=left | Disc.: Cerro TololoAdded on 22 July 2020Alt.: 2016 GX276 || 
|- id="2000 OH67" bgcolor=#C2E0FF
| 4 ||  || TNO || 6.61 || 245 km || multiple || 2000–2021 || 08 Aug 2021 || 29 || align=left | Disc.: Cerro TololoLoUTNOs, cubewano (hot) || 
|- id="2000 ON67" bgcolor=#C2E0FF
| 2 ||  || TNO || 6.79 || 146 km || multiple || 2000–2021 || 12 Sep 2021 || 60 || align=left | Disc.: Cerro TololoLoUTNOs, cubewano (cold) || 
|- id="2000 OP67" bgcolor=#C2E0FF
| 3 ||  || TNO || 7.49 || 115 km || multiple || 2000–2021 || 03 Oct 2021 || 37 || align=left | Disc.: Cerro TololoLoUTNOs, res4:7 || 
|- id="2000 OB68" bgcolor=#fefefe
| 0 ||  || MBA-I || 18.56 || data-sort-value="0.62" | 600 m || multiple || 2000–2022 || 31 Jul 2022 || 55 || align=left | Disc.: Cerro TololoAlt.: 2011 OL17 || 
|- id="2000 OT69" bgcolor=#d6d6d6
| 0 ||  || MBA-O || 16.4 || 2.9 km || multiple || 2000–2020 || 11 May 2020 || 82 || align=left | Disc.: Mauna Kea Obs.Alt.: 2014 ED65 || 
|- id="2000 OU69" bgcolor=#C2E0FF
| 2 ||  || TNO || 6.79 || 146 km || multiple || 2000–2021 || 09 Jul 2021 || 79 || align=left | Disc.: Cerro TololoLoUTNOs, cubewano (cold) || 
|- id="2000 OZ69" bgcolor=#E9E9E9
| 0 ||  || MBA-M || 17.11 || 1.1 km || multiple || 2000–2021 || 04 Dec 2021 || 167 || align=left | Disc.: Cerro Tololo || 
|- id="2000 OA70" bgcolor=#d6d6d6
| 0 ||  || MBA-O || 16.46 || 2.8 km || multiple || 2000–2021 || 12 May 2021 || 146 || align=left | Disc.: Cerro Tololo || 
|- id="2000 OB70" bgcolor=#d6d6d6
| 0 ||  || MBA-O || 16.75 || 2.5 km || multiple || 2000–2021 || 13 May 2021 || 110 || align=left | Disc.: Cerro Tololo || 
|- id="2000 OC70" bgcolor=#d6d6d6
| 0 ||  || MBA-O || 16.7 || 2.5 km || multiple || 2000–2020 || 15 May 2020 || 75 || align=left | Disc.: Cerro Tololo || 
|- id="2000 OD70" bgcolor=#fefefe
| 0 ||  || MBA-I || 18.0 || data-sort-value="0.75" | 750 m || multiple || 2000–2020 || 08 Oct 2020 || 101 || align=left | Disc.: Cerro Tololo || 
|- id="2000 OF70" bgcolor=#E9E9E9
| 0 ||  || MBA-M || 17.66 || 1.2 km || multiple || 2000–2021 || 02 Oct 2021 || 112 || align=left | Disc.: Cerro Tololo || 
|- id="2000 OH70" bgcolor=#E9E9E9
| 0 ||  || MBA-M || 17.1 || 1.6 km || multiple || 2000–2019 || 04 Feb 2019 || 66 || align=left | Disc.: Cerro Tololo || 
|- id="2000 OJ70" bgcolor=#d6d6d6
| 0 ||  || MBA-O || 16.25 || 3.1 km || multiple || 2000–2021 || 07 Jul 2021 || 136 || align=left | Disc.: Cerro Tololo || 
|- id="2000 OK70" bgcolor=#fefefe
| 0 ||  || MBA-I || 18.28 || data-sort-value="0.66" | 660 m || multiple || 2000–2021 || 08 May 2021 || 77 || align=left | Disc.: Cerro Tololo || 
|- id="2000 OL70" bgcolor=#fefefe
| 0 ||  || MBA-I || 18.19 || data-sort-value="0.68" | 680 m || multiple || 2000–2021 || 08 Apr 2021 || 109 || align=left | Disc.: Cerro TololoAlt.: 2012 XG12 || 
|- id="2000 OM70" bgcolor=#fefefe
| 0 ||  || MBA-I || 18.5 || data-sort-value="0.59" | 590 m || multiple || 2000–2018 || 12 Jul 2018 || 51 || align=left | Disc.: Cerro Tololo || 
|- id="2000 OQ70" bgcolor=#fefefe
| 0 ||  || MBA-I || 18.4 || data-sort-value="0.62" | 620 m || multiple || 2000–2019 || 29 Oct 2019 || 55 || align=left | Disc.: Cerro Tololo || 
|- id="2000 OS70" bgcolor=#fefefe
| 0 ||  || MBA-I || 17.81 || data-sort-value="0.81" | 810 m || multiple || 2000–2022 || 25 Jan 2022 || 61 || align=left | Disc.: Cerro Tololo || 
|- id="2000 OT70" bgcolor=#fefefe
| 0 ||  || MBA-I || 18.4 || data-sort-value="0.62" | 620 m || multiple || 1993–2021 || 03 Oct 2021 || 126 || align=left | Disc.: Cerro TololoAlt.: 2010 ML101 || 
|- id="2000 OV70" bgcolor=#fefefe
| 0 ||  || MBA-I || 18.1 || data-sort-value="0.71" | 710 m || multiple || 2000–2021 || 15 Jan 2021 || 66 || align=left | Disc.: Cerro Tololo || 
|- id="2000 OX70" bgcolor=#E9E9E9
| 0 ||  || MBA-M || 18.03 || 1.0 km || multiple || 2000–2020 || 27 Feb 2020 || 46 || align=left | Disc.: Cerro Tololo || 
|- id="2000 OY70" bgcolor=#fefefe
| 0 ||  || MBA-I || 19.21 || data-sort-value="0.43" | 430 m || multiple || 2000–2021 || 13 Sep 2021 || 43 || align=left | Disc.: Cerro Tololo || 
|- id="2000 OZ70" bgcolor=#fefefe
| 1 ||  || MBA-I || 19.5 || data-sort-value="0.37" | 370 m || multiple || 2000–2019 || 05 Aug 2019 || 52 || align=left | Disc.: Cerro Tololo || 
|- id="2000 OA71" bgcolor=#E9E9E9
| 0 ||  || MBA-M || 17.3 || 1.9 km || multiple || 2000–2021 || 18 Jan 2021 || 50 || align=left | Disc.: Cerro Tololo || 
|- id="2000 OB71" bgcolor=#E9E9E9
| 0 ||  || MBA-M || 18.15 || data-sort-value="0.70" | 700 m || multiple || 2000–2021 || 07 Nov 2021 || 58 || align=left | Disc.: Cerro Tololo || 
|- id="2000 OC71" bgcolor=#d6d6d6
| 0 ||  || MBA-O || 17.41 || 1.8 km || multiple || 2000–2021 || 26 Nov 2021 || 71 || align=left | Disc.: Cerro Tololo || 
|- id="2000 OD71" bgcolor=#E9E9E9
| 0 ||  || MBA-M || 17.3 || 1.5 km || multiple || 2000–2021 || 23 Jan 2021 || 41 || align=left | Disc.: Cerro Tololo || 
|- id="2000 OE71" bgcolor=#E9E9E9
| 0 ||  || MBA-M || 18.1 || 1.0 km || multiple || 2000–2016 || 28 Feb 2016 || 37 || align=left | Disc.: Cerro Tololo || 
|- id="2000 OF71" bgcolor=#FA8072
| 0 ||  || MCA || 19.2 || data-sort-value="0.43" | 430 m || multiple || 2000–2016 || 29 Jun 2016 || 32 || align=left | Disc.: Cerro Tololo || 
|- id="2000 OG71" bgcolor=#fefefe
| 0 ||  = (619207) || MBA-I || 18.3 || data-sort-value="0.65" | 650 m || multiple || 2000–2021 || 09 May 2021 || 92 || align=left | Disc.: Cerro Tololo || 
|- id="2000 OH71" bgcolor=#fefefe
| 0 ||  || MBA-I || 19.0 || data-sort-value="0.47" | 470 m || multiple || 2000–2020 || 05 Nov 2020 || 86 || align=left | Disc.: Cerro Tololo || 
|- id="2000 OJ71" bgcolor=#fefefe
| 1 ||  || MBA-I || 18.7 || data-sort-value="0.54" | 540 m || multiple || 2000–2021 || 18 Jan 2021 || 41 || align=left | Disc.: Cerro Tololo || 
|- id="2000 OK71" bgcolor=#E9E9E9
| 0 ||  || MBA-M || 17.85 || data-sort-value="0.80" | 800 m || multiple || 2000–2021 || 27 Nov 2021 || 95 || align=left | Disc.: Cerro Tololo || 
|- id="2000 OL71" bgcolor=#E9E9E9
| 0 ||  || MBA-M || 17.7 || 1.2 km || multiple || 2000–2020 || 26 Apr 2020 || 81 || align=left | Disc.: Cerro Tololo || 
|- id="2000 ON71" bgcolor=#E9E9E9
| 0 ||  || MBA-M || 17.8 || 1.5 km || multiple || 2000–2019 || 26 Oct 2019 || 74 || align=left | Disc.: Cerro Tololo || 
|- id="2000 OO71" bgcolor=#E9E9E9
| 0 ||  || MBA-M || 18.05 || data-sort-value="0.73" | 730 m || multiple || 2000–2021 || 02 Dec 2021 || 89 || align=left | Disc.: Cerro Tololo || 
|- id="2000 OP71" bgcolor=#d6d6d6
| 0 ||  || MBA-O || 16.7 || 2.5 km || multiple || 2000–2020 || 11 May 2020 || 63 || align=left | Disc.: Cerro Tololo || 
|- id="2000 OQ71" bgcolor=#fefefe
| 0 ||  || MBA-I || 18.5 || data-sort-value="0.59" | 590 m || multiple || 2000–2019 || 04 Nov 2019 || 63 || align=left | Disc.: Spacewatch || 
|- id="2000 OR71" bgcolor=#fefefe
| 0 ||  || MBA-I || 18.23 || data-sort-value="0.67" | 670 m || multiple || 2000–2021 || 07 Apr 2021 || 62 || align=left | Disc.: Cerro TololoAlt.: 2011 OD61 || 
|- id="2000 OS71" bgcolor=#fefefe
| 0 ||  || MBA-I || 18.7 || data-sort-value="0.54" | 540 m || multiple || 2000–2019 || 23 Sep 2019 || 56 || align=left | Disc.: Cerro Tololo || 
|- id="2000 OT71" bgcolor=#fefefe
| 1 ||  || MBA-I || 18.8 || data-sort-value="0.52" | 520 m || multiple || 2000–2020 || 16 Sep 2020 || 52 || align=left | Disc.: Cerro Tololo || 
|- id="2000 OU71" bgcolor=#fefefe
| 1 ||  || MBA-I || 18.6 || data-sort-value="0.57" | 570 m || multiple || 2000–2019 || 02 Nov 2019 || 48 || align=left | Disc.: Cerro Tololo || 
|- id="2000 OW71" bgcolor=#d6d6d6
| 0 ||  || MBA-O || 16.86 || 2.4 km || multiple || 2000–2021 || 09 Apr 2021 || 68 || align=left | Disc.: Cerro Tololo || 
|- id="2000 OX71" bgcolor=#fefefe
| 1 ||  || MBA-I || 17.4 || data-sort-value="0.98" | 980 m || multiple || 2000–2021 || 18 Jan 2021 || 86 || align=left | Disc.: SpacewatchAlt.: 2010 JT63 || 
|- id="2000 OZ71" bgcolor=#fefefe
| 0 ||  || MBA-I || 18.4 || data-sort-value="0.62" | 620 m || multiple || 2000–2018 || 12 Jul 2018 || 38 || align=left | Disc.: Spacewatch || 
|- id="2000 OA72" bgcolor=#E9E9E9
| 0 ||  || MBA-M || 17.6 || 1.7 km || multiple || 2000–2019 || 04 Nov 2019 || 32 || align=left | Disc.: Cerro Tololo || 
|- id="2000 OB72" bgcolor=#E9E9E9
| 0 ||  || MBA-M || 18.32 || data-sort-value="0.64" | 640 m || multiple || 2000–2021 || 30 Nov 2021 || 99 || align=left | Disc.: Cerro Tololo || 
|- id="2000 OD72" bgcolor=#d6d6d6
| 1 ||  || MBA-O || 17.3 || 1.9 km || multiple || 2000–2020 || 15 May 2020 || 32 || align=left | Disc.: Cerro Tololo || 
|- id="2000 OE72" bgcolor=#fefefe
| 1 ||  || MBA-I || 18.6 || data-sort-value="0.57" | 570 m || multiple || 2000–2018 || 07 Sep 2018 || 31 || align=left | Disc.: Cerro Tololo || 
|- id="2000 OF72" bgcolor=#fefefe
| 1 ||  || MBA-I || 19.3 || data-sort-value="0.41" | 410 m || multiple || 2000–2019 || 25 Oct 2019 || 35 || align=left | Disc.: Cerro Tololo || 
|- id="2000 OG72" bgcolor=#fefefe
| 0 ||  || MBA-I || 18.6 || data-sort-value="0.57" | 570 m || multiple || 2000–2017 || 25 Apr 2017 || 27 || align=left | Disc.: Cerro Tololo || 
|- id="2000 OJ72" bgcolor=#E9E9E9
| 0 ||  || MBA-M || 17.5 || 1.8 km || multiple || 2000–2019 || 24 Sep 2019 || 59 || align=left | Disc.: Cerro Tololo || 
|- id="2000 OK72" bgcolor=#E9E9E9
| 0 ||  || MBA-M || 17.9 || 1.1 km || multiple || 2000–2020 || 23 Mar 2020 || 62 || align=left | Disc.: Cerro Tololo || 
|- id="2000 OL72" bgcolor=#fefefe
| 0 ||  || MBA-I || 17.9 || data-sort-value="0.78" | 780 m || multiple || 2000–2021 || 18 Jan 2021 || 60 || align=left | Disc.: Cerro Tololo || 
|- id="2000 OM72" bgcolor=#fefefe
| 0 ||  || MBA-I || 18.3 || data-sort-value="0.65" | 650 m || multiple || 2000–2020 || 11 Dec 2020 || 87 || align=left | Disc.: Cerro Tololo || 
|- id="2000 ON72" bgcolor=#fefefe
| 1 ||  || MBA-I || 19.2 || data-sort-value="0.43" | 430 m || multiple || 2000–2019 || 28 Aug 2019 || 41 || align=left | Disc.: Cerro Tololo || 
|- id="2000 OO72" bgcolor=#d6d6d6
| 0 ||  || MBA-O || 16.9 || 2.3 km || multiple || 2000–2019 || 04 Feb 2019 || 35 || align=left | Disc.: Cerro Tololo || 
|- id="2000 OR72" bgcolor=#fefefe
| 0 ||  || MBA-I || 18.45 || data-sort-value="0.61" | 610 m || multiple || 2000–2022 || 27 Jan 2022 || 38 || align=left | Disc.: Cerro Tololo || 
|- id="2000 OS72" bgcolor=#fefefe
| 0 ||  || MBA-I || 19.3 || data-sort-value="0.41" | 410 m || multiple || 2000–2019 || 28 Aug 2019 || 27 || align=left | Disc.: Cerro Tololo || 
|- id="2000 OT72" bgcolor=#E9E9E9
| 0 ||  || MBA-M || 18.34 || data-sort-value="0.64" | 640 m || multiple || 2000–2021 || 15 Sep 2021 || 39 || align=left | Disc.: Cerro Tololo || 
|- id="2000 OU72" bgcolor=#fefefe
| 0 ||  || MBA-I || 18.9 || data-sort-value="0.49" | 490 m || multiple || 2000–2020 || 27 Feb 2020 || 43 || align=left | Disc.: Cerro Tololo || 
|- id="2000 OV72" bgcolor=#d6d6d6
| 0 ||  || MBA-O || 17.20 || 2.0 km || multiple || 2000–2021 || 09 Sep 2021 || 49 || align=left | Disc.: Cerro TololoAlt.: 2006 TE144 || 
|- id="2000 OW72" bgcolor=#d6d6d6
| 0 ||  || MBA-O || 16.9 || 2.3 km || multiple || 2000–2020 || 01 Feb 2020 || 37 || align=left | Disc.: Cerro Tololo || 
|- id="2000 OX72" bgcolor=#d6d6d6
| 0 ||  || MBA-O || 17.4 || 1.8 km || multiple || 2000–2019 || 04 Feb 2019 || 30 || align=left | Disc.: Cerro Tololo || 
|- id="2000 OY72" bgcolor=#d6d6d6
| 2 ||  || MBA-O || 17.6 || 1.7 km || multiple || 2000–2017 || 24 Aug 2017 || 22 || align=left | Disc.: Cerro Tololo || 
|- id="2000 OZ72" bgcolor=#E9E9E9
| 0 ||  || MBA-M || 18.0 || 1.4 km || multiple || 2000–2019 || 26 Sep 2019 || 31 || align=left | Disc.: Cerro Tololo || 
|- id="2000 OA73" bgcolor=#d6d6d6
| 0 ||  || MBA-O || 17.7 || 1.6 km || multiple || 2000–2017 || 14 Dec 2017 || 35 || align=left | Disc.: Cerro Tololo || 
|- id="2000 OB73" bgcolor=#fefefe
| 0 ||  || MBA-I || 18.0 || data-sort-value="0.75" | 750 m || multiple || 2000–2021 || 08 Jun 2021 || 50 || align=left | Disc.: Cerro TololoAlt.: 2010 BD85 || 
|- id="2000 OC73" bgcolor=#E9E9E9
| 0 ||  || MBA-M || 17.3 || 1.9 km || multiple || 2000–2019 || 03 Dec 2019 || 64 || align=left | Disc.: Cerro Tololo || 
|- id="2000 OD73" bgcolor=#d6d6d6
| 0 ||  || MBA-O || 16.95 || 2.3 km || multiple || 2000–2021 || 18 May 2021 || 78 || align=left | Disc.: Cerro Tololo || 
|- id="2000 OE73" bgcolor=#d6d6d6
| 0 ||  || MBA-O || 16.46 || 2.8 km || multiple || 2000–2020 || 22 Feb 2020 || 89 || align=left | Disc.: Cerro TololoAlt.: 2010 DQ52 || 
|- id="2000 OF73" bgcolor=#d6d6d6
| 0 ||  || MBA-O || 17.45 || 1.8 km || multiple || 2000–2021 || 07 Apr 2021 || 52 || align=left | Disc.: Cerro Tololo || 
|- id="2000 OG73" bgcolor=#fefefe
| 0 ||  || MBA-I || 18.4 || data-sort-value="0.62" | 620 m || multiple || 2000–2020 || 24 Jan 2020 || 47 || align=left | Disc.: Cerro Tololo || 
|- id="2000 OH73" bgcolor=#fefefe
| 0 ||  || MBA-I || 17.91 || data-sort-value="0.78" | 780 m || multiple || 2000–2022 || 27 Jan 2022 || 66 || align=left | Disc.: Cerro Tololo || 
|- id="2000 OJ73" bgcolor=#d6d6d6
| 0 ||  || MBA-O || 16.5 || 2.8 km || multiple || 2000–2020 || 21 Mar 2020 || 68 || align=left | Disc.: Cerro Tololo || 
|- id="2000 OK73" bgcolor=#d6d6d6
| 0 ||  || MBA-O || 17.4 || 1.8 km || multiple || 2000–2019 || 02 Jan 2019 || 36 || align=left | Disc.: Cerro Tololo || 
|- id="2000 OL73" bgcolor=#E9E9E9
| 0 ||  || MBA-M || 17.8 || 1.5 km || multiple || 2000–2020 || 25 Feb 2020 || 67 || align=left | Disc.: Cerro Tololo || 
|- id="2000 OM73" bgcolor=#fefefe
| 1 ||  || MBA-I || 19.3 || data-sort-value="0.41" | 410 m || multiple || 2000–2019 || 26 Sep 2019 || 32 || align=left | Disc.: Cerro Tololo || 
|- id="2000 ON73" bgcolor=#fefefe
| 0 ||  || MBA-I || 18.57 || data-sort-value="0.57" | 570 m || multiple || 2000–2021 || 07 Oct 2021 || 62 || align=left | Disc.: Cerro Tololo || 
|- id="2000 OO73" bgcolor=#fefefe
| 0 ||  || MBA-I || 18.49 || data-sort-value="0.60" | 600 m || multiple || 2000–2021 || 18 May 2021 || 63 || align=left | Disc.: Cerro Tololo || 
|- id="2000 OP73" bgcolor=#fefefe
| 1 ||  || MBA-I || 18.3 || data-sort-value="0.65" | 650 m || multiple || 2000–2019 || 27 Oct 2019 || 21 || align=left | Disc.: Cerro Tololo || 
|- id="2000 OQ73" bgcolor=#fefefe
| 1 ||  || MBA-I || 19.15 || data-sort-value="0.49" | 450 m || multiple || 2000–2022 || 01 Nov 2022 || 46 || align=left | Disc.: Cerro TololoAdded on 22 July 2020 || 
|- id="2000 OR73" bgcolor=#d6d6d6
| 0 ||  || MBA-O || 16.5 || 2.8 km || multiple || 2000–2019 || 27 Jan 2019 || 29 || align=left | Disc.: Cerro TololoAdded on 22 July 2020 || 
|- id="2000 OS73" bgcolor=#d6d6d6
| 0 ||  || MBA-O || 17.32 || 1.9 km || multiple || 2000–2021 || 19 Apr 2021 || 41 || align=left | Disc.: Cerro TololoAdded on 22 July 2020 || 
|- id="2000 OT73" bgcolor=#E9E9E9
| 0 ||  || MBA-M || 17.77 || 1.6 km || multiple || 2000–2021 || 15 Apr 2021 || 100 || align=left | Disc.: Cerro TololoAdded on 22 July 2020 || 
|- id="2000 OU73" bgcolor=#d6d6d6
| 0 ||  || MBA-O || 17.36 || 1.9 km || multiple || 2000–2022 || 12 Jan 2022 || 71 || align=left | Disc.: Cerro TololoAdded on 17 January 2021 || 
|- id="2000 OV73" bgcolor=#d6d6d6
| 3 ||  || MBA-O || 18.1 || 1.3 km || multiple || 2000–2020 || 28 Feb 2020 || 23 || align=left | Disc.: Cerro TololoAdded on 9 March 2021 || 
|- id="2000 OW73" bgcolor=#d6d6d6
| 2 ||  || MBA-O || 17.61 || 1.7 km || multiple || 2000–2021 || 09 May 2021 || 27 || align=left | Disc.: Cerro TololoAdded on 11 May 2021 || 
|- id="2000 OX73" bgcolor=#d6d6d6
| 0 ||  || MBA-O || 17.3 || 1.9 km || multiple || 2000–2020 || 27 Apr 2020 || 35 || align=left | Disc.: Cerro TololoAdded on 21 August 2021 || 
|- id="2000 OY73" bgcolor=#d6d6d6
| 0 ||  || MBA-O || 17.54 || 1.7 km || multiple || 2000–2021 || 27 Oct 2021 || 43 || align=left | Disc.: Cerro TololoAdded on 30 September 2021 || 
|- id="2000 OZ73" bgcolor=#d6d6d6
| 2 ||  || MBA-O || 18.3 || 1.2 km || multiple || 2000–2017 || 08 Dec 2017 || 23 || align=left | Disc.: Cerro TololoAdded on 5 November 2021 || 
|- id="2000 OA74" bgcolor=#d6d6d6
| 0 ||  || MBA-O || 17.7 || 1.6 km || multiple || 2000–2021 || 11 Nov 2021 || 30 || align=left | Disc.: Cerro TololoAdded on 24 December 2021 || 
|}
back to top

References 
 

Lists of unnumbered minor planets